= Manuel de Codage =

Digital encoding system for Egyptian hieroglyphic texts

The Manuel de Codage (French: [manɥɛl də kɔdaʒ]), abbreviated MdC, is a standard system for the computer-encoding of Egyptian hieroglyphic texts.

== History ==
In 1984 a committee was charged with the task to develop a uniform system for the encoding of hieroglyphic texts on the computer. The resulting Manual for the Encoding of Hieroglyphic Texts for Computer-input (Jan Buurman, Nicolas Grimal, Jochen Hallof, Michael Hainsworth and Dirk van der Plas, Informatique et Egyptologie 2, Paris 1988) is generally shortened to Manuel de Codage. It presents an easy-to-use way of encoding hieroglyphic writing as well as the abbreviated hieroglyphic transliteration. The encoding system of the Manuel de Codage has since been adopted by international Egyptology as the official common standard for registering hieroglyphic texts on the computer.

Egyptologists have scheduled a revision for 2007 of the Manuel de Codage, in order to ensure broader implementation in current and future software.

== List of Gardiner's fundamental uniliteral hieroglyphs and their transliteration ==
Hieroglyph	Hieratic	Transliteration	MdC encoding	MdC transliteration
A		Ꜣ	A	A
i		ꞽ	i	i
i i		y	i*i	y
y		y / ï	y	y
a		Ꜥ	a	a
w		w	w	w
W (Note: Used instead of the above in later times.)		w	W	w
b		b	b	b
p		p	p	p
f		f	f	f
m		m	m	m
M		m	M	m
n		n	n	n
N		n	N	n
r		r	r	r
l		l	l	l / rw
h		h	h	h
H		ḥ	H	H
x		ḫ	x	x
X		ẖ	X	X
z		z	z	z
s		s	s	s
S		š	S	S
q		ḳ	q	q
k		k	k	k
g		g	g	g
t		t	t	t
T		ṯ (Note: From Middle Egyptian on, merged with t.)	T	T
d		d	d	d
D		ḏ (Note: From Middle Egyptian on, merged with d.)	D	D

The MdC specifies a method for electronically encoding complete ancient Egyptian texts, indicating many of the features characterizing hieroglyphic writing such as the placement, orientation, colour, and even size of individual hieroglyphs. Hieroglyphs not included in the list of fundamentals are referred to by their Gardiner number. This system is used (though frequently with modifications) by various software packages developed for typesetting hieroglyphic texts (such as SignWriter, WinGlyph, MacScribe, InScribe, Glyphotext, WikiHiero, and others). It is loosely based on the common representation of algebraic formulae. Some of the rules are:

- the "-"-sign concatenates the signs or group of signs between which it is placed.
- the ":"-sign places the first sign or group of signs above the second sign
- the "*"-sign juxtaposes two signs or groups of signs
- the rounded brackets "( )" form a compact grouping of signs arranged according to the other rules, which is treated as if it were a single sign
- the "< >"-brackets mark cartouches
- the "!"-sign marks an end of line
- the "!!"-sign marks an end of page

=== Examples ===
- The name Amenhotep, in hieroglyphs i mn n R4 t p, would be transliterated thus: i-mn:n-R4:t*p, where mn stands for mn and R4 is the Gardiner number for the Htp hieroglyph. Instead of writing R4, one could use Htp, but not all signs in the Gardiner list can be transliterated in such a way, as there are many hieroglyphs transliterated with the same Latin character in the case of uniliterals and characters in the case of bi- and triliterals. The most frequently used hieroglyph was chosen to be represented by a certain letter or letter combination. Thus n stands for n rather than for S3, which phonetically is represented with n as well.
- In order to add a cartouche, as seen in < i mn n R4 t p >, one would write < i-mn:n-R4:t*p > or < i-mn:n-Htp:t*p >

== Encoding ==
The IETF language tag list establishes the codes:

- egy-mdcegyp and egy-Latn-mdcegyp for hieroglyphic text encoded according to the Manuel
- egy-mdctrans and egy-Latn-mdctrans for transliteration of Ancient Egyptian encoded according to the Manuel

== See also ==
- Gardiner's sign list of hieroglyphs
