= T (hieroglyph) =

Egyptian hieroglyph

X1
t
(or "feminine")

Bread bun
"semicircle"
in hieroglyphs

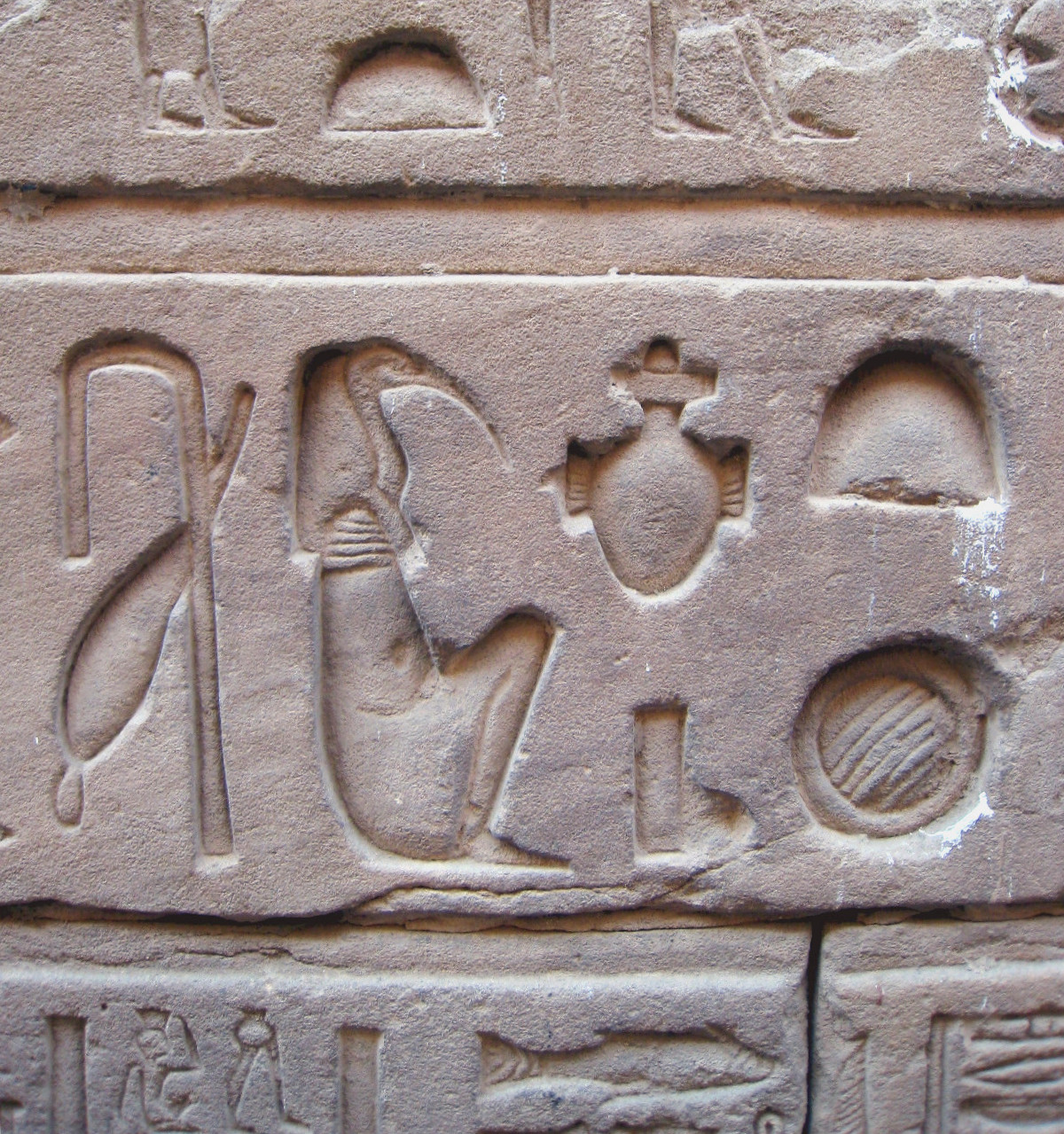
(detailed) Close-up of hieroglyphs; 2 uses of t.

The ancient Egyptian Bread bun hieroglyph is Gardiner sign listed no. X1 for the side view of a bread bun. It is also the simple shape of a semicircle. The hieroglyph is listed under the Gardiner category of loaves and cakes.

The bread bun hieroglyph is used in the Ancient Egyptian language hieroglyphs for the alphabetic consonant letter t. A later alternative t, is a pestle, with curved top, Gardiner U33. U33

== "Bread bun/semi-circle" as feminine determiner ==
Besides alphabetic-t, the bread bun is used for words that are feminine, as an end qualifying determinative, often shown before other qualifying ideograms or determinants in the hieroglyphic word block-(quadrat hieroglyphic block). It is one of the most frequently used signs in hieroglyphic writing.

== Palermo Stone ==
The t hieroglyph is used extensively throughout the Palermo Stone of the 24th to 23rd century BC, and it is used in the first row (Row I of VI), for the naming of King Tiu of Lower Egypt (a King of the North).

=== Palermo Stone, King Series, Row I (predynastic) ===
The following is the list of predynastic pharaohs (Nile Delta north) represented on the Palermo Piece of the 7–piece Palermo Stone: The sequence is in the proper order with the beginning Pharaoh on the right: (reading right-to-left, seven complete names pictured in year-registers):

- Mekh, Wazner, Neheb, Thesh, Tiu (Tiu), Khayu, Hsekiu.

G17 F32 M13 K5 N35 U14 V13 N39 X1 M17 G43 L6 E9 S29 D28
- Owl...Papyrus...Ripple......Tether...Bread&Feather.Bivalve...Cloth
- Belly.....Fish......Plow........Lake.............Quail.........Newborn...Ka

Note: On the Palermo Stone all the hieroglyphs face in the other direction (Gardiner signs are only facing left; on the stone they face right (reading right-to-left)). The source of the following Pharaohs is only from this King List; a few have artifacts that further confirm their reign (the Double Falcon King). The pharaohs deficient in information are: Hsekiu, Khayu, Tiu (pharaoh), Thesh, Neheb, Wazner, Mekh.

Preceded by (start of T)	X1; Breadbun or "feminine" t	Succeeded by N16; Land ti

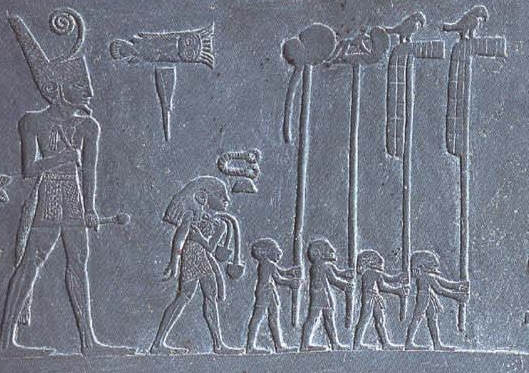
Narmer Palette detail, from late 3rd millennium Ancient Egypt

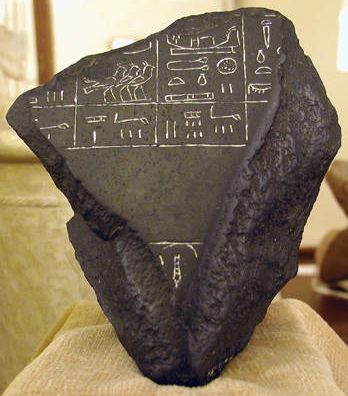
Nile River flood levels recorded on 1-piece of the 7—piece Palermo Stone. Note the 2-uses of t.

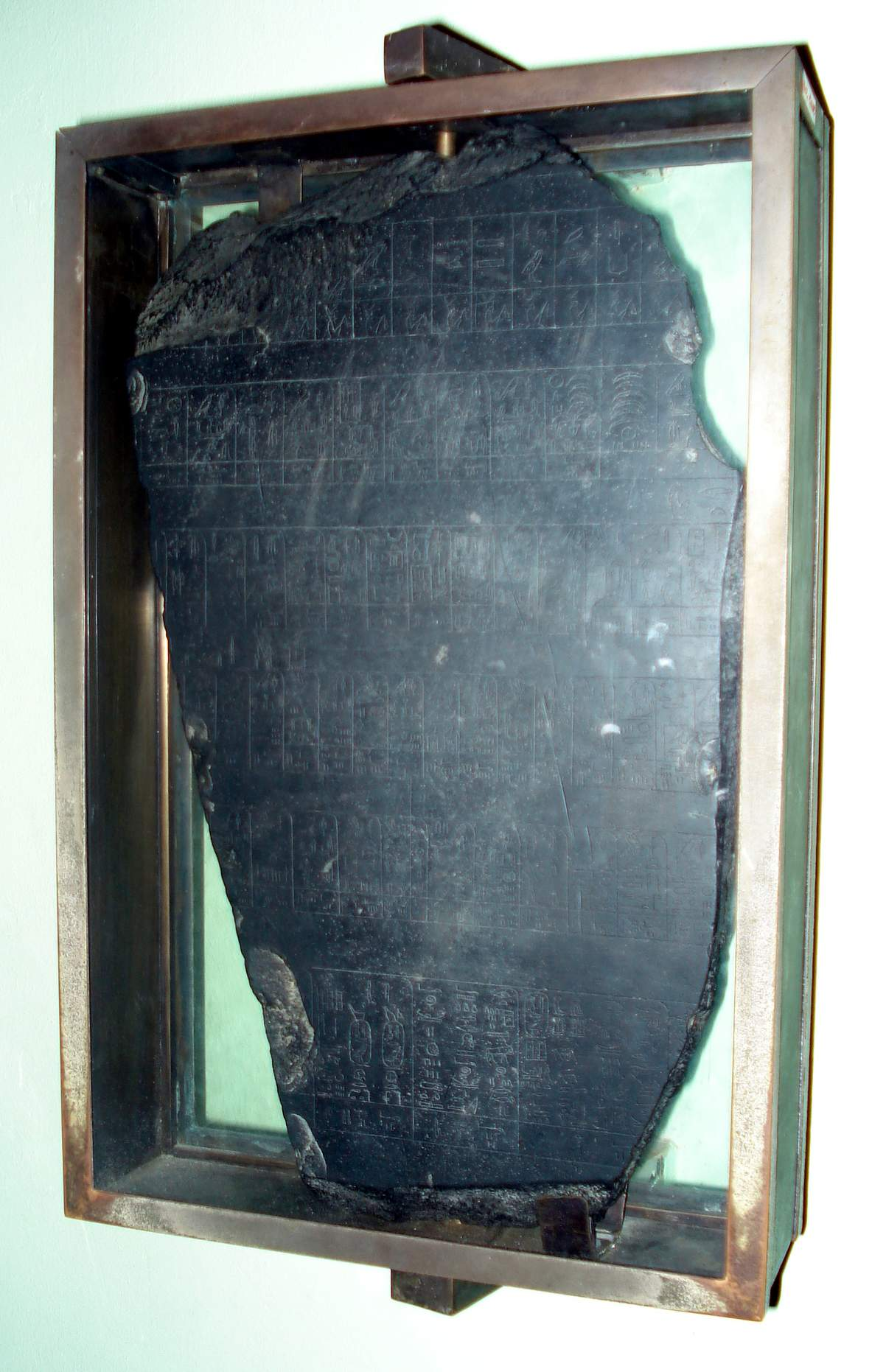
Palermo piece (at Palermo Museum), of the 7—piece Palermo Stone

== The Egyptian hieroglyph alphabetic letters ==
The following two tables show the Egyptian uniliteral signs. (24 letters, but multiple use hieroglyphs)

a G1	y M17 M17	' D36	(w,u); G43	B b
P p	M G17	N N35	R D21	H1 h
H2; H	Kh2; F32	S O34	(Sh)=Š; N37	Q/K2; N29
K k	T t	Ch—Tj; V13	D d	Dj; I10
L/(R) (special) (Ptolemaic, etc.); E23	--	--	--	--

a	i (ee)	y ii	' ah, (aïn)	w, (u) (oo)	B
P	F	M	N	R	H1
H2	(Kh)1	(Kh)2	S	Sh (Sh)	K emphatic
K	G	T	Tj; Ch; Tsh	D	Dj
(additionally 4 for vert/horiz)	--	--	--	--	--
Aa15; M (horiz); M2-Plinth	S3; N (vert) (see: N (red crown))	S29; S (vert); S (folded) cloth)			M (3rd-M -2nd-vert); M3-Baker's tool (vertical)
(additionally 3 for equivalents)	--	--	--	--	--
M17 M17 is—Z4 y2-Two strokes	G43 is—Z7 letter w, u (see w2-Coil)		U33; T (no. 2); T2-Pestle		

== See also ==
- Gardiner's Sign List#X. Loaves and Cakes
- List of Egyptian hieroglyphs

== Bibliography ==
- Schumann-Antelme, and Rossini, 1998. Illustrated Hieroglyphics Handbook, Ruth Schumann-Antelme, and Stéphane Rossini. c 1998, English trans. 2002, Sterling Publishing Co. (Index, Summary lists (tables), selected uniliterals, biliterals, and triliterals.) (softcover, ISBN 1-4027-0025-3)
