= Km and Km.t (Kemet) (hieroglyphs) =

Egyptian hieroglyph

I6
"black"
in hieroglyphs

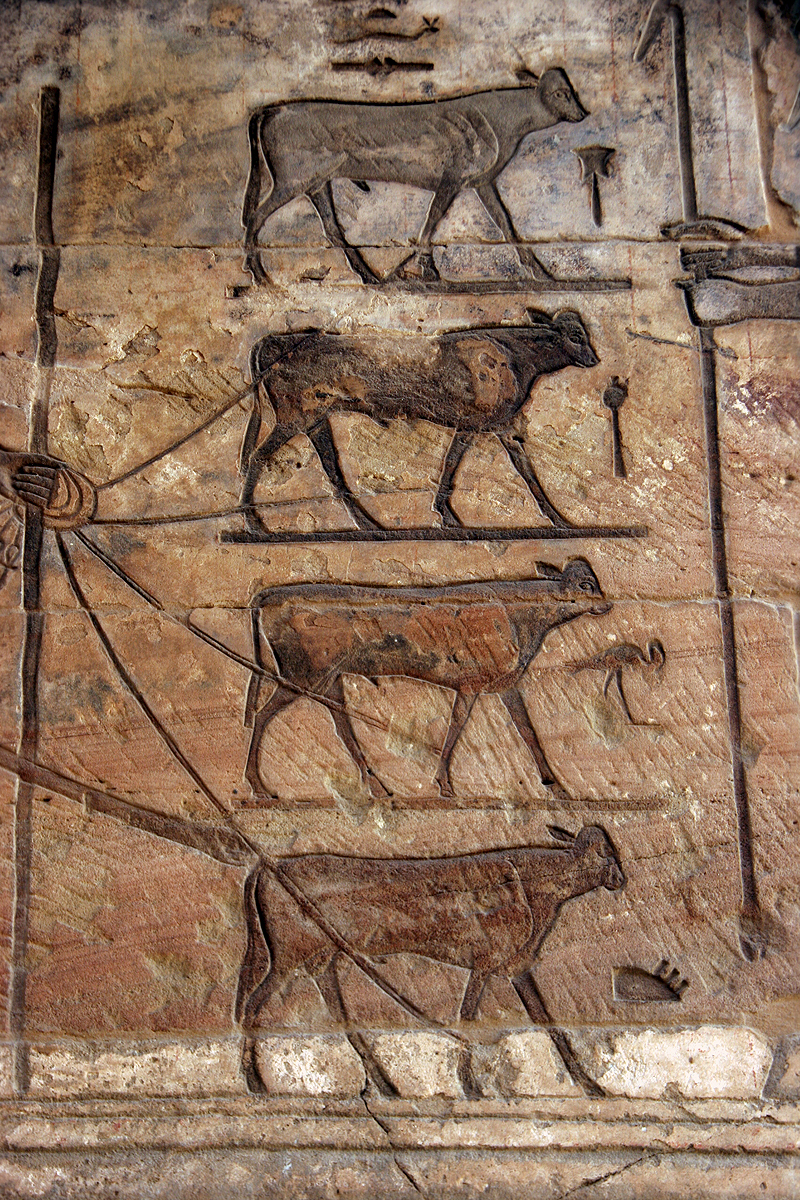
I6 The 'Km' hieroglyph is shown to the right of the bottom-most calf describing its black color. Above it hieroglyphs for red, white and spotted calves

Km refers to the ancient Egyptian hieroglyph broadly associated with the color black. It was used in color descriptions, abstract contexts, and everything in between. This symbol was the basis for one of the ancient Egyptians' names for their country: km.t (Kemet).

== Km ==
I6

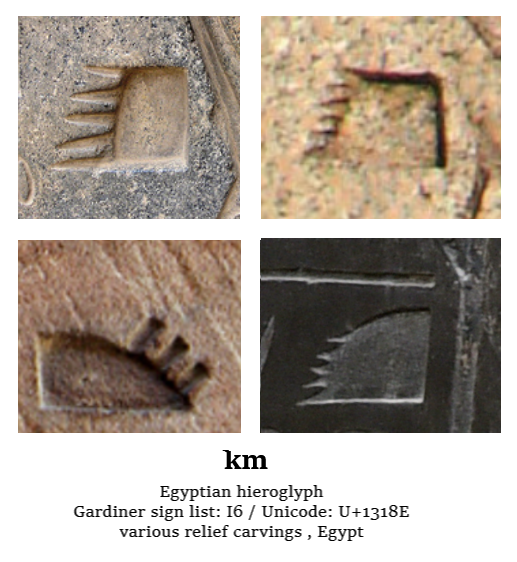
Km hieroglyph depicted in various Egyptian relief carvings

km is the Egyptian hieroglyph for the color black and also used to indicate conclusion or completion, in Gardiner's sign list km is numbered I6. Its phonetic value is km. The Wörterbuch der ägyptischen Sprache ('Dictionary of the Egyptian Language') lists no less than 24 different compound variants of km including black objects such as black stone, metal, wood, hair, eyes, and animals, and in some instances applied to a person's name.

I6

Why the km hieroglyph looks the way it does is unknown. In Gardiner's Sign List it's described as "piece of crocodile-skin with spines" and is in section I under "amphibious animals, reptiles, etc" although other hieroglyphs categorized by Gardiner in this way, like I5, the hieroglyph for crocodile

I5

all depict the whole animal and there is no known Egyptian text that organize the hieroglyphs into categories. Rossini and Schumann-Antelme propose that the km hieroglyph (Gardiner: I6) actually depicts crocodile claws coming out of the hide. and that km originally derived from the word 'ikm' meaning 'shield' although typically they were made of cow hide (but later copper or bronze) If it depicts part of a crocodile, hide or foot, its relation to the color black is unknown (although Nile crocodiles may appear dark gray, or loosely "black" in color).

In some texts the km hieroglyph means 'coming to an end', terminating, or "an item of completion". The blackness of night, a completion of the day, potentially connects the meanings. Consistent with this meaning some scholars believe the hieroglyph depicts

I6

"a piece charcoal burning to its ending", this at the same time, a black colored object.

== Km.t (Kemet) ==
I6 G17 X1 O49

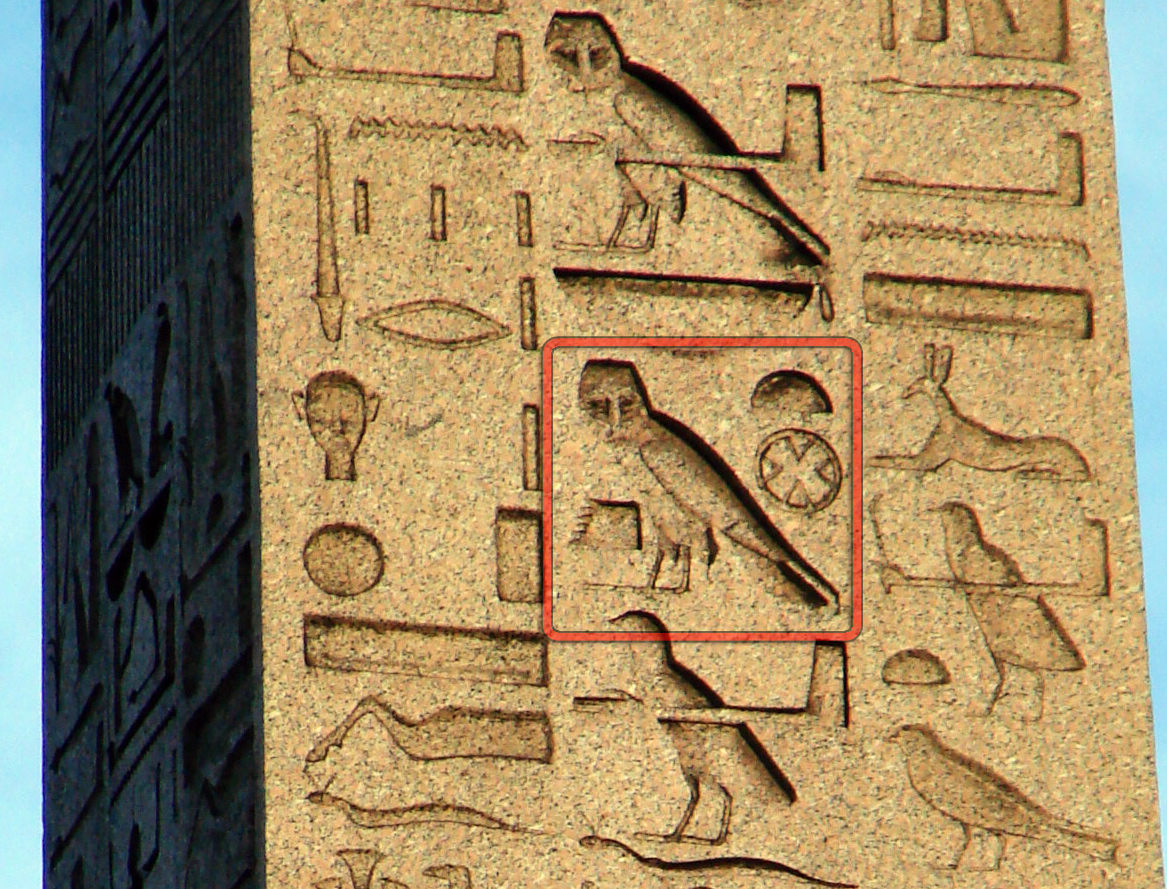
The name of Egypt on the Luxor Obelisk of Ramesses II. (Egyptian: km-m-t 𓆎 𓅓 𓏏 with "City-Region" determinative '𓊖', "kmt")

Starting around the 11th-12th dynasty Ancient Egypt was referred to as Kemet ( 'km.t' ). Many scholars theorize the word may refer to the fertile black colored soil along the banks of the Nile. In other instances, beginning around this same period, the word Ta-meri (“The Beloved Land”) (tꜣ-mrj)

tA U7 r i tr niwt

was also used to refer to Egypt. The determinative O49

O49

used in both words is the hieroglyph for 'country, inhabited/cultivated land' and called the niw.t (a political designate) It is believed to represent a 'town intersection' of roads.

== Kemet (km.t) and the Kmi Demotic place names in the Rosetta Stone ==
The Rosetta Stone of 198 BC includes the 'km.t' three times and of 22 Kmi place names for ancient Egypt, 7 use the hieroglyph iAt-

M17 G1 X1

, signifying the soil of Egypt, N30: X1*Z2-

N30 N23 X1 Z1

, which is the Greek form of "Egypt", signifying it as "the (divine) place of the mound (of creation)" and the fertile black soil of the land after the Inundation. The doubled hieroglyph,

N23

, Gardiner N23, is used as the Two Lands, (Upper Egypt, and Lower Egypt), and the common use of "Ta-Mer-t", and additionally uses of 'Horus of the Two Lands' .)

In the Demotic (Egyptian) text of the Rosetta Stone, the demotic for Egypt is 'Kmi' . There are three uses of the actual Kmi, but seven others referenced as Kmi refer to iAt in the hieroglyphs. Other euphemistic references to Egypt in the Rosetta Stone include "Ta-Mer-t", which has the meaning of the 'full/fruitful/cultivated land', hr-tAwy, the 'lands of Horus', and tAwy, the "Two Lands."

Kmi—spelling-"Egypt" —(22 places, synchronized, Demotic–Hieroglyphs)

- demotic—hieroglyphs

  1. –Kmi—Ta-Mer-t
  2. –Kmi—Ta-Mer-t
  3. –Kmi—rsy.t + mHt
    (i.e. South and North)(lands)
  4. –Kmi—"Hr tAwy"
  5. –Kmi—kmt-(restored)
  6. –Kmi—Ta-Mer-t
  7. –Kmi—Ta-Mer-t
  8. –Kmi—iAt
  9. –Kmi—kmt
  10. –Kmi—"Hr tAwy"
  11. –Kmi—Ta-Mer-t
  12. –Kmi—iAt
  13. –Kmi—iAt
- demotic—hieroglyphs
- 14.–Kmi—XXXXXX-(omitted from text)
- 15.–Kmi—rsy.t + mHt
  (i.e. South and North)(lands)
- 16.–Bki—iAt
- 17.–Kmi—kmt
- 18.–Kmi—iAt
- 19.–Kmi—tAwy
- 20.–Kmi—iAt
- 21.–Kmi—iAt
- 22.–Kmi—Ta-Mer-t
- --
- --
- --

== Egyptian word examples, conclusion, completion, kmt, km iri ==
I6 G17 M17 M17 X1 V12 I6 G17 Aa29
"conclusion" and "to total"--("complete")
--"kmt"--and--"km iri"--
in hieroglyphs

Coming to a conclusion, or completion is one use of the km hieroglyph in the words kmt and km iri ('to make an end'). The discussion of the biliteral states: The conclusion of a document, written in black ink, ending the work, has the same semantic connotation. (as km for 'concluding') The Rossini, Schumann-Antelme write-up states that initially the word comes from "shield", ikm, and thus the original association with the crocodile.

== In: An Egyptian Hieroglyphic Dictionary by E. A. Wallis Budge, Volume 2, 1920 ==
On page 787B and 788A in the "K"-section km is rendered as "kam" and related variations follow

The first 5 entries, kam, kam-t, or kamkam relate to the meaning "to end, to bring to an end, to finish, to complete" (Entry four is untranslated and is from Papyrus 3024, Lepsius, Denkmaler-(papyrus).) The references for the others in the first five are: Peasant, Die Klagen des Bauern, 1908., Thes.-(Thesaurus Inscriptionum Aegyptiacarum, Brugsch);. A. Z.-(twice); Shipwreck., 118-(Tale of the shipwrecked sailor); Amen.-(author: Amen-em-apt); and Thes. (again).

Entries 6,7 and 8 describe being black and black-colored things. also referring to Coptic refer to coptic "KAME", for 6 and 8; entry 7 to coptic "KMOM", "KMEM". For entry 7, to be black, Budge also references Revue-(Rev.); for entry 8, black items, Budge also references T.-(King Teta); and N.-(Pepi II-(King Nefer-ka-Ra). 9, "Kammau" as Egyptian, 10 "kami-t" as ^ :, books of the black land, 11 the same word "kami-t" also as "black cow" or "black cattle". 12 "Kam-ur" is defined as "The Red Sea" Variations that follow include various animals, gods, goddesses and a couple of lakes

21 and 22, describe a "buckler", or "shield", and "black wood". The last of the 27 entries describe black stones, or powders and black plants, or seeds; (all small multiple, plural, grains-of, items). Entry 26 is an image, or statue, using the vertical mummy hieroglyph gardiner A53, ("in the form of", "the custom of"). These last six entries are unreferenced.

The 1920 Budge dictionary is a compilation of 200 referenced works by 120 authors. During Budge's own lifetime and today some scholars have disputed its interpretation of hieroglyphs and texts. Budge's transliteration system was unique to Budge. Most Egyptologists then (and today) use the transcription and transliteration system developed by the Berlin School which issued the master compendium of Egyptian hieroglyphic language in 1926, Wörterbuch der Aegyptischen Sprache (7 Vols.), and which is detailed in the publication by A. H. Gardiner, Egyptian Grammar: Being an Introduction to the Study of Hieroglyphs (1957)).

== Shield ==
M17 I6 G17 F27 D36 Aa1 G17
"shield" and "to put an end to"
--"ikm"--and--'khm--
in hieroglyphs

"Shield", ikm and another word with an approximate km cognate, 'khm starting with the vowel ( ' ), 'khm, meaning to put to an end are the possible words related to the origins of the crocodile skin, and the 'verb of action', of items coming to an end. The second word 'khm has nine entries in the Budge dictionary, shield, ikam, has two entries.

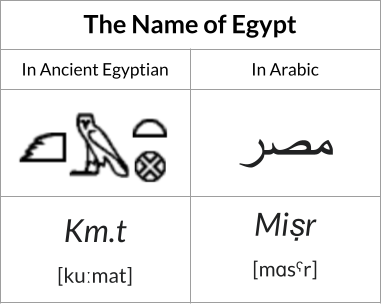
The name of Egypt name in ancient egyptian and arabic

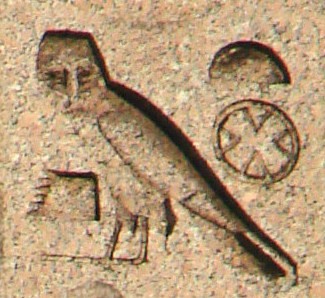
from the Luxor Obelisk on the Place de la Concorde in Paris, originally erected by Ramses II in Egypt

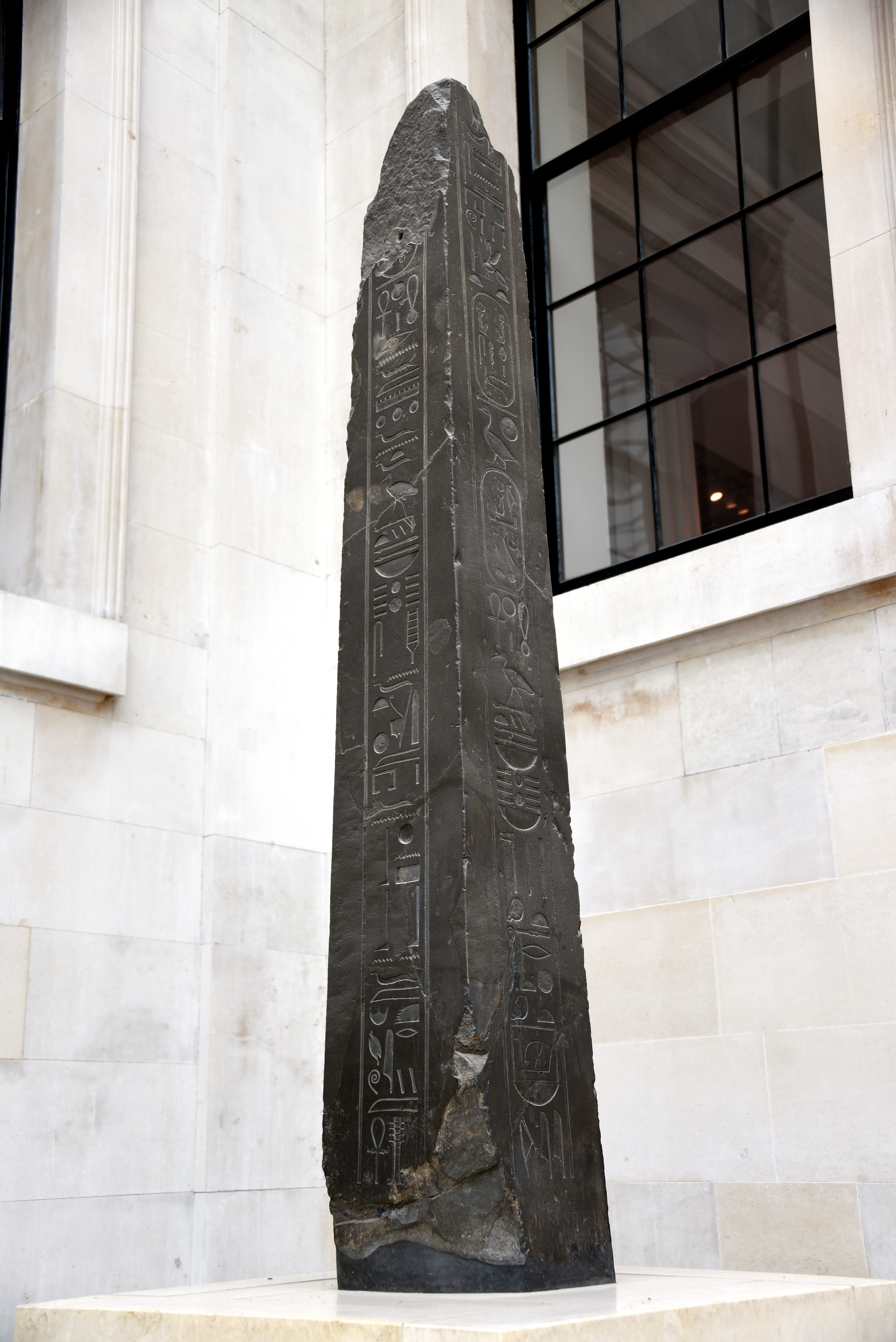
Obelisk of Nectanebo II
kmt hieroglyph on lower left

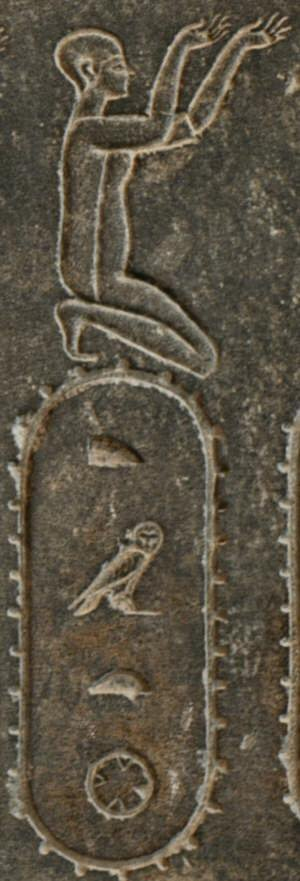
Susa, Statue of Darius I, king of Peria, carved in Egypt from greywacke from the quarries of the Wadi Hammamat, but was later erected near the Great Gate of the royal palace in Susa.

== See also ==
- Gardiner's Sign List#I. Amphibious Animals, Reptiles, etc.
- List of Egyptian hieroglyphs
- Name of Egypt
- Kmt (journal)
- Mnewer, the black bull: "Black-Great (One)", Kemwer-(Km-wr)
