= Reading Egyptian Art =

Primer book

Reading Egyptian Art: A Hieroglyphic Guide to Ancient Egyptian Painting and Sculpture is a 1992 primer on Egyptian hieroglyphs written by English archaeologist Richard H. Wilkinson.The book was written from the viewpoint of seeing hieroglyphs in the context of their use in iconography of sculpture, monuments, reliefs, tomb reliefs, and literature, specifically the corpus of The Book of the Dead versions for various deceased Egyptians, and other areas.

The book is arranged sequentially with the 26 categories of Gardiner's Sign List. Each entry is a detailed write-up, and a facing page of one to six graphic or photo examples, elucidating the usage of hieroglyphs.

== Example categories ==
=== Hippopotamus hieroglyph ===
The hippopotamus, Gardiner E25, E25 shows a "Faience hippopotamus, Meir, 12th Dynasty." The photo is a small statuette, the hippo skin covered with large lined lotus buds, and lotus blossoms.

=== Follower Sign ===
The less common Follower Sign, Gardiner T18, T18 uses three examples, the first being from the Tomb of Sennedjem, Thebes, 19th Dynasty, and shows the barque of Ra and the main iconography of the Follower Sign, Ra as seated God, and the Steering Oar (hieroglyph) at the rear.

=== "Clenched Hand" from the palette corpus ===
The not-so-common Clenched Hand, Gardiner D49, (khefa), D49 shows 4 graphics, but the largest is one side of the Bull Palette, from the Predynastic Period cosmetic palette corpus, with its iconography of warriors on a field, the 'community large rope', and 5 standards-for-gods, (iat standard (hieroglyph)).
