= Hand-with-droplets (hieroglyph) =

Egyptian hieroglyph

D46A
Hand-with-
'dew'-drops
( unguent/ or water )
in hieroglyphs

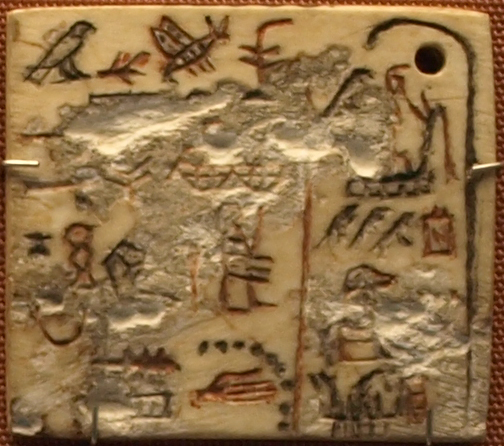
Ivory label of Pharaoh Semerkhet, Old Kingdom.

The ancient Egyptian Hand-with-droplets hieroglyph, Gardiner sign listed no. D46A is a portrayal of the hand, with droplet offerings. In the Old Kingdom usage it is found on ivory labels and slab stelas, presumably with the use of 'aroma' and unguents, or with incense. As the verb usage with 'libation', water or liquids are involved.

== Usage ==
The hand-with-droplets hierogoglyph is used as a determinative for water libations, or the aroma droplets, (or incense) related to unguents. The Egyptian language usage of the noun, as "incense" or an "incense offering", is id, or id.t, represented as:

M17 D46A X1 M17 D46 X1 T12

The second spelling uses the bowstring hieroglyph as a determinative, presumably for its 'strength', and the 'power of unguent aromas'-(i.e. perfumes). The Egyptian language verb form, "to cense, to pour out a libation", spelled as id, idy, has three hieroglyph spellings in the Budge two-volume dictionary.

M17 D46A M17 M17 M17 D46A D46 N38

The third uses the pool-lake-basin hieroglyph as determinative. A third noun usage is for the word "dew", Egyptian language id. The single form has many spellings with the determinative usage-(or with alternate determinants), and a plural form in hieroglyphs as:

M17 D46A D46A D46A X1

Single forms for "dew" also use the Sky-with-rain (hieroglyph) as the determinative, with multiple spellings.

M17 D46 G43 N4 Z3

The noun "dew" is based on the Coptic language eiote (five entries), and translated as: dew, mist, vapour, rain-storm, moisture, and exudation, listed under Egyptian language, iad, with some spellings of:

N4 M17 G1 D46 X1 D46A N35 N35 N35

Preceded by V15 tether-with- walking-legs -- -- i(th)	D46A hand-with- droplets -- -- id, idy	Succeeded by D18 W24 vicar wakil -- -- idnu (idn)

== Gallery ==
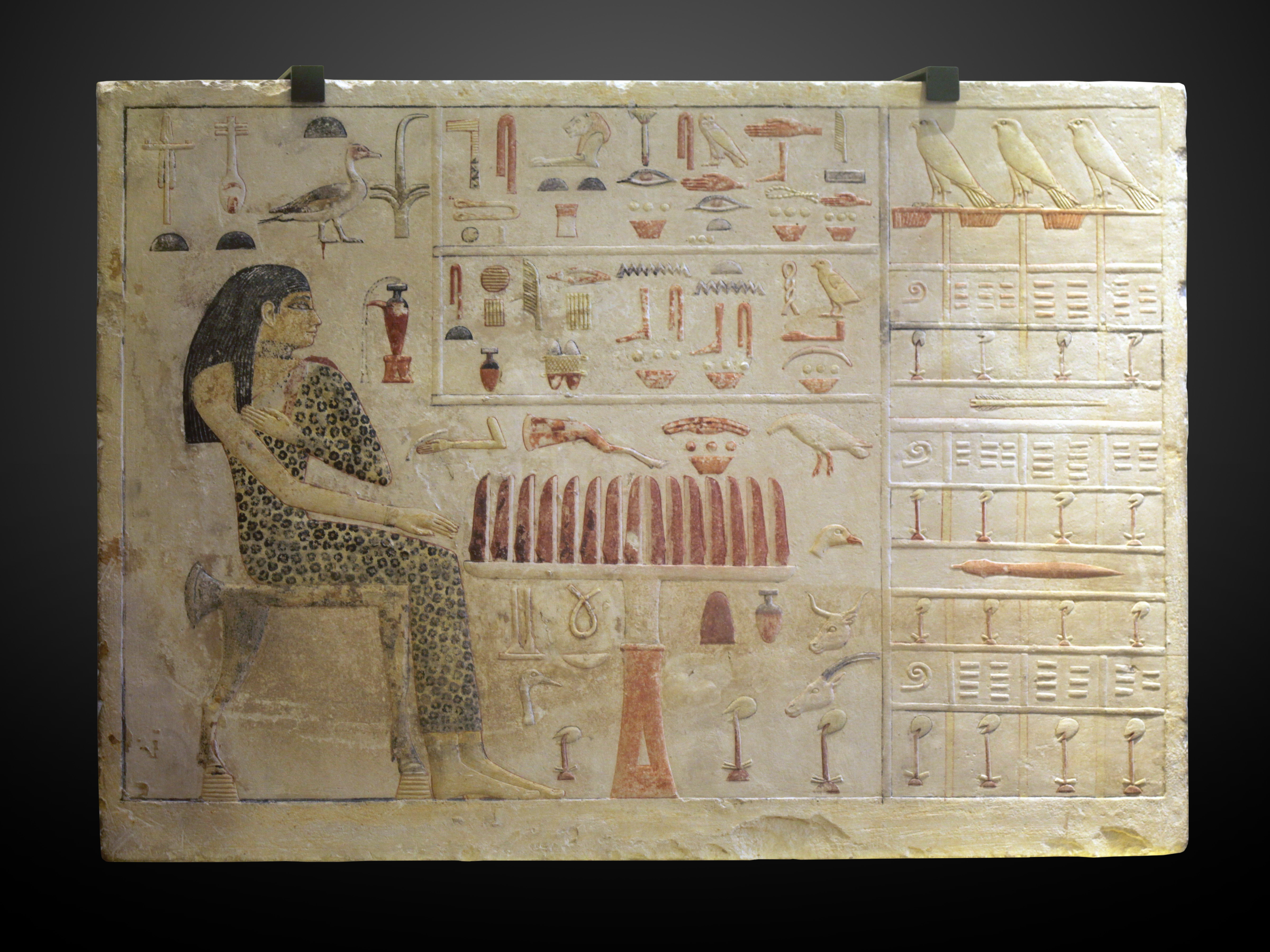
Slab stela of Nfr.t-Ab.t; as feminine(.t) she is the "Eastern Beauty"-(Ab-Nfr)

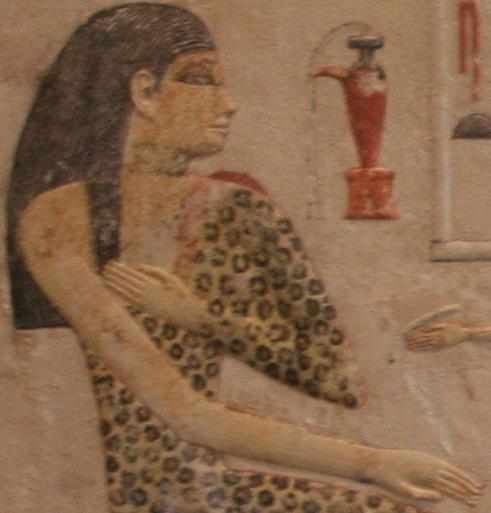
(close-up detail of hieroglyphs)

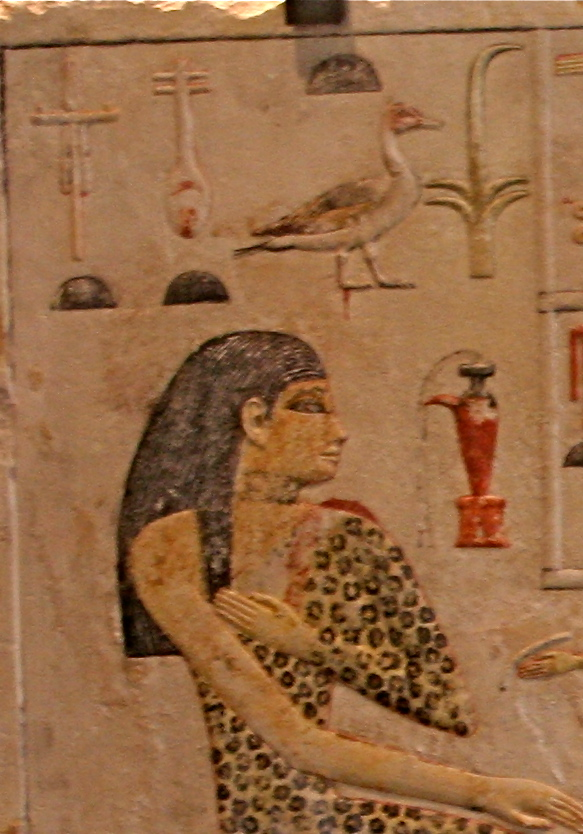
(close-up)

== See also ==
- Gardiner's Sign List#D. Parts of the Human Body
- List of Egyptian hieroglyphs
- Hand (hieroglyph)
