= Land, irrigated (hieroglyph) =

Egyptian hieroglyph

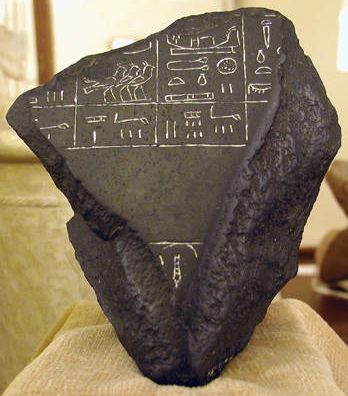
Nile River flood levels recorded on the Palermo Stone. (two uses of the Land, irrigated (hieroglyph)

N24
Land
("sectioned")

sp3t
in hieroglyphs

Gardiner: N24

The Land, irrigated hieroglyph ("sectioned land", Gardiner N24) represents "district, nome" (phonetic value spꜣt). It is a determinative in the name of provinces and regions in the noun ḥsp, for "garden", "vegetable garden", and "orchard".

== See also ==
- Gardiner's Sign List#N. Sky, Earth, Water
- List of Egyptian hieroglyphs
- Arm, cubit symbol (hieroglyph)
