= Hand (hieroglyph) =

Egyptian hieroglyph

D46
Hand
(also, letter "d")
in hieroglyphs

D47
Hand
version 2
in hieroglyphs

D48
Hand
version 3
in hieroglyphs

In ancient Egyptian hieroglyphs, the hand symbol represented the phoneme /d/, and was also used as a determinative for actions performed as if with the hands.

== Iconographic usage ==
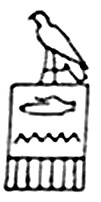
Pharaoh Den's serekh.

Also used in iconography. Pharaoh Den of the First Dynasty used the hand as part of his name: d + n.

An even earlier usage of hand can be compared to the sister hieroglyph: Hand-fist (hieroglyph). Five fists are held onto a rope bordering a hunt scene on a predynastic cosmetic palette. The damaged Bull Palette from Hierakonpolis is notable since each hand forms the base of a wooden vertical standard, with god-like animals, one standing on top of each.

== Rosetta Stone usage as word: "hand" ==
The hand as hieroglyphic character also forms the word for 'hand' in the Ancient Egyptian hieroglyphic language: ṯet. In line 13, (R-13), one of ten ways for honoring the Pharaoh Ptolemy V was:

[...] and let be engraved the Rank: "Priest of the god appearing (epiphanous), lord of benefits (Greek eucharistos)", upon the rings worn on their hands-(hieroglyph).

In the first half of the Rosetta Stone (the Decree of Memphis (Ptolemy V)), supplied by the Nubayrah Stele, line N-22, the hand hieroglyph is used as part of an important word that implies the use of 'hands', or 'action'. The district or town that defiled Pharaoh, and had to be defeated, is referred to as: "[...] (the rebels) they led astray-(hand hieroglyph: seṯeman-sen) the nomes".

== The Egyptian hieroglyphic alphabetic letters ==
The following two tables show the Egyptian uniliteral signs (24 letters, but multiple-use hieroglyphs).

a G1	i M17	y M17 M17	' D36	(w,u); G43	B b
P p	F f	M G17	N N35	R D21	H1 h
H2; H	Kh1; Aa1	Kh2; F32	S O34	(Sh)=Š; N37	Q/K2; N29
K k	G g	T t	Ch—Tj; V13	D d	Dj; I10
L/(R) (special) (Ptolemaic, etc.); E23	--	--	--	--	--

a	i (ee)	y ii	' ah, (aïn)	w, (u) (oo)	B
P	F	M	N	R	H1
H2	(Kh)1	(Kh)2	S	Sh (Sh)	K emphatic
K	G	T	Tj; Ch; Tsh	D	Dj
(additionally 4 for vert/horiz)	--	--	--	--	--
Aa15; M (horiz); M2-Plinth	S3; N (vert) (see: N (red crown))	S29; S (vert); S (folded) cloth)			M (3rd-M -2nd-vert); M3-Baker's tool (vertical)
(additionally 3 for equivalents)	--	--	--	--	--
M17 M17 is—Z4 y2-Two strokes	G43 is—Z7 letter w, u (see w2-Coil)		U33; T (no. 2); T2-Pestle		

== See also ==
- Gardiner's Sign List#D. Parts of the Human Body
- List of Egyptian hieroglyphs
- Hand-with-droplets (hieroglyph)
- Manicule – Symbol depicting a pointing finger
