= Game piece (hieroglyph) =

Egyptian hieroglyph

Y6
Game piece
"Token"
in hieroglyphs

M17 b Y6
Draughtsman
in hieroglyphs

The ancient Egyptian Game piece (hieroglyph), also a Token, or the general term for any gaming-gambling piece, Draughtsman is an ancient hieroglyph. Gaming pieces were certainly required in predynastic times, as the cultural creation of games and entertainment has a long history in most cultures. An ivory-piece lion is known from the Old Kingdom of ancient Egypt; the set contains three lions, and three dog tokens of ivory.

The Senet is recorded as the oldest boardgame in history, for which tokens are used.

== Use of the "game piece" hieroglyph ==
M17 b G29 F40 G43 Y6 Y6 Y6 A32
To Dance"
[of the god]
(2 plurals, 1 chick, 3 tokens)
in hieroglyphs

The basic word for "Game piece" or "Draughtsman" is "ab". By implication, people on a flat arena were moving like "pieces" (from a distance), and numerous varieties of the word 'to dance' include varieties using the "Game piece", as a determinative; two examples are shown: the word 'draughtsman', and 'to dance'-(the plural of "ab", "abU"-(U being the language plural-but also the "quail chick (hieroglyph)" in Ancient Egypt).

== Iconographic use ==
The most common use of the "Gaming piece" as an artefact of ancient Egypt, would be the use with the game of Senet. The Senet game was often put into tombs and grave sites, as part of the grave goods; the games were part of the pastimes for the afterlife, including any other common 'hobbies' of the deceased–(for example hunting ducks at the marsh using a throwstick). Since board games represent the common man's activities, the Senet game has numerous examples from Ancient Egypt; this also includes the reliefs shown on temple walls, of individuals enjoying their activities in the afterlife.

== Example "gaming tokens" ==
Some example game pieces of ancient Egypt. One of the more famous games was "Hounds and Jackals", a race game, with far less artefacts found of the game.

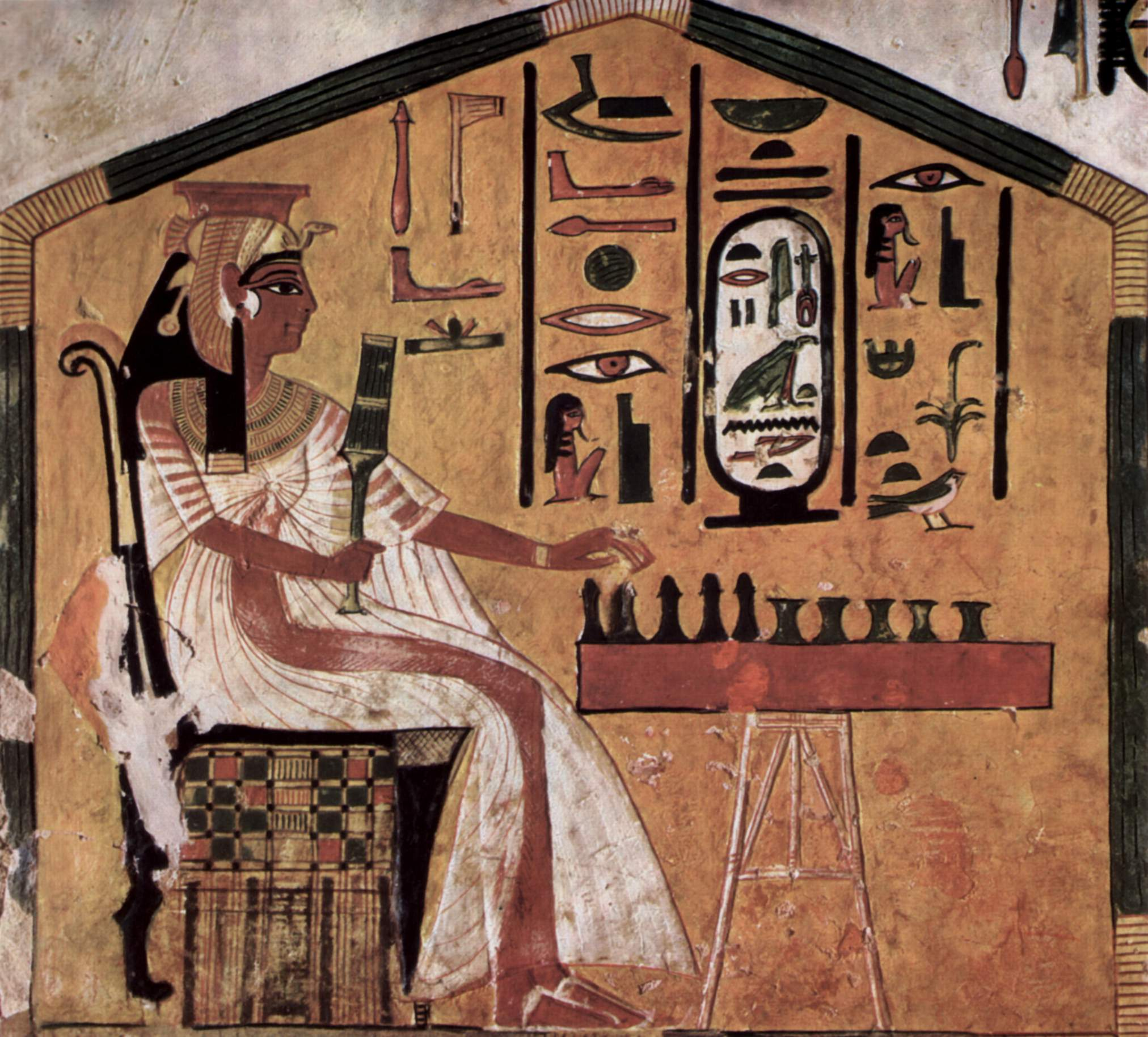
Nefertari from her tomb scene, playing Senet

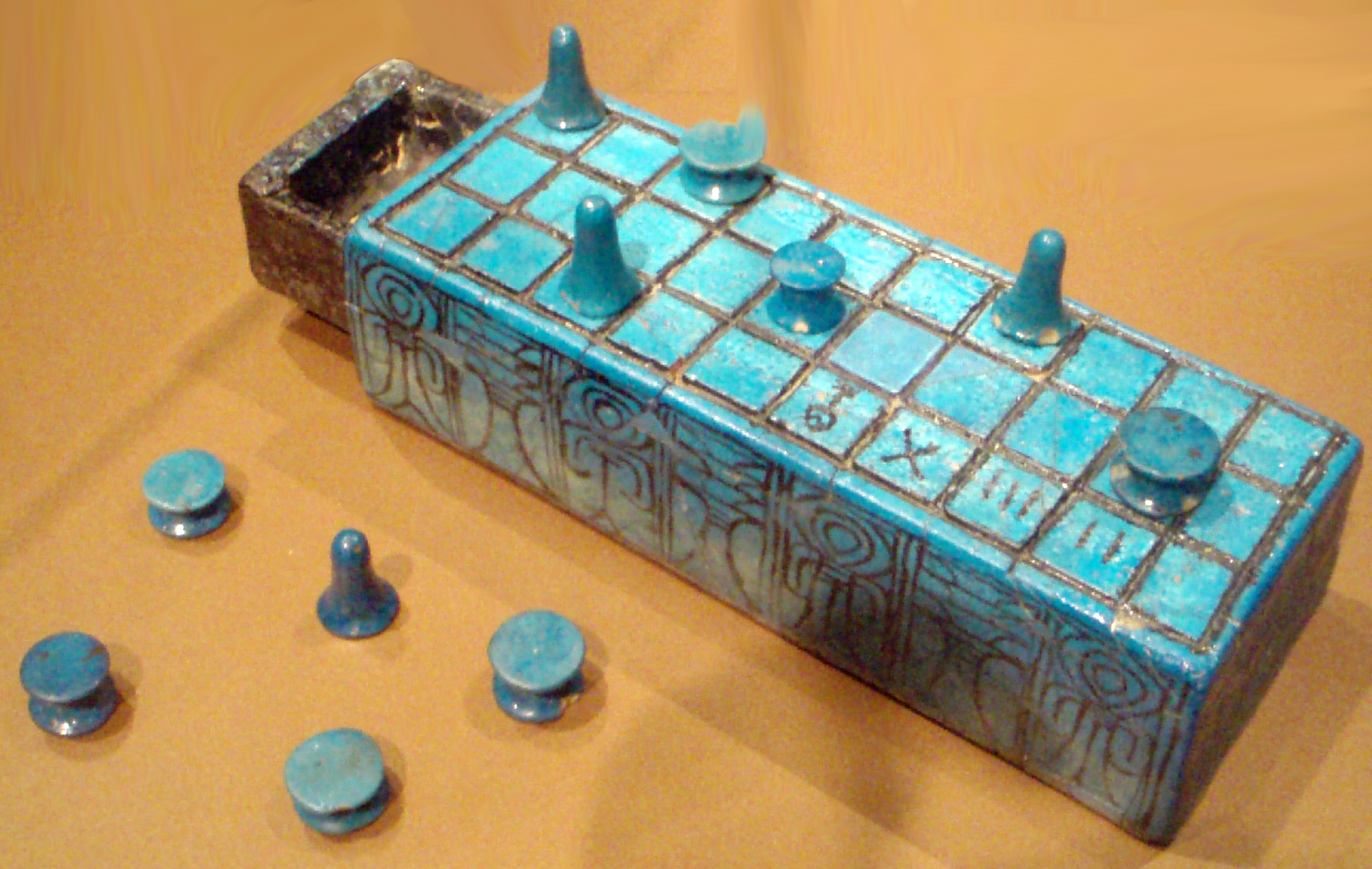
Gamepiece "tokens" (common) and a Senet gameboard

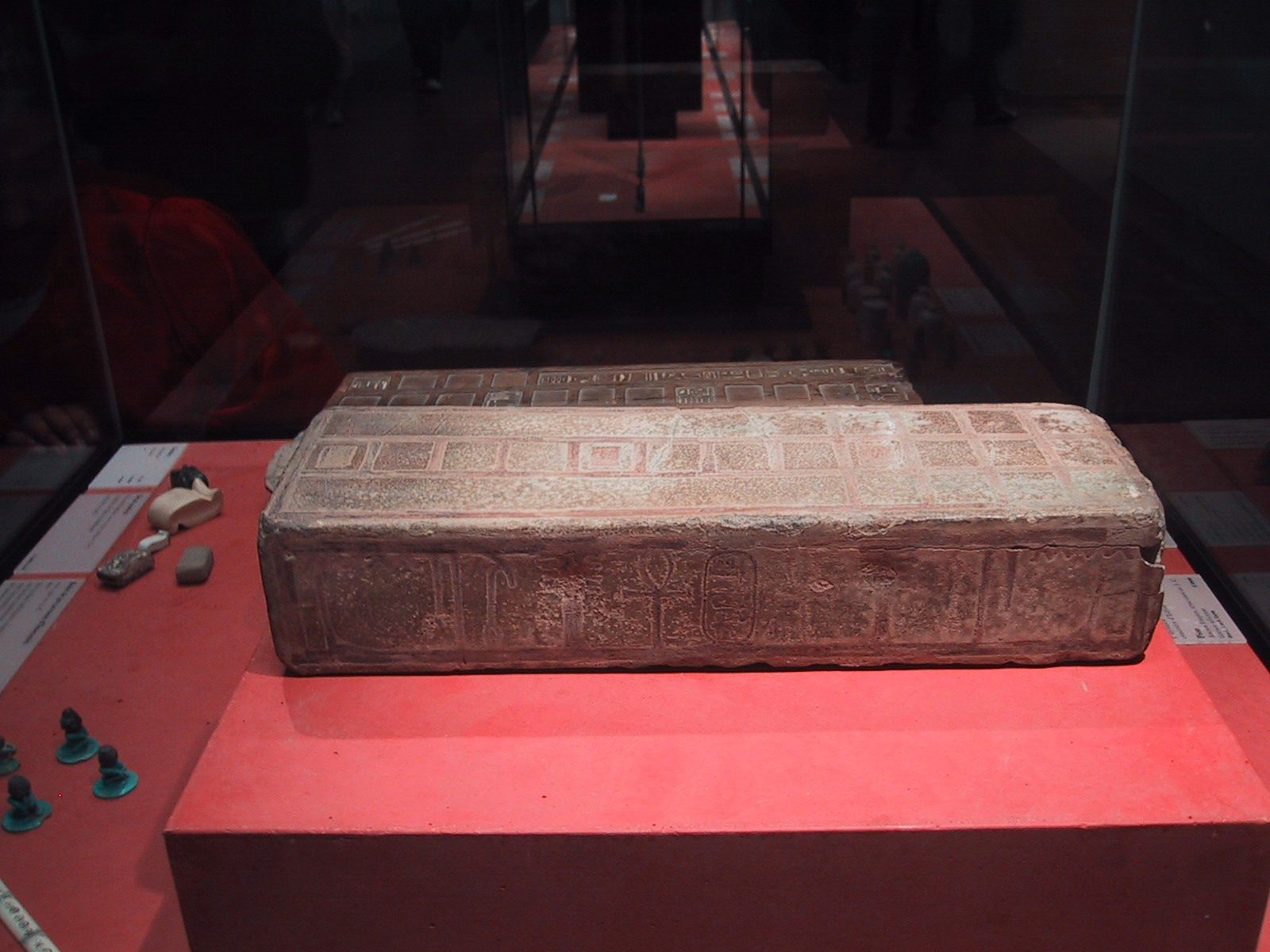
Gamepieces and board

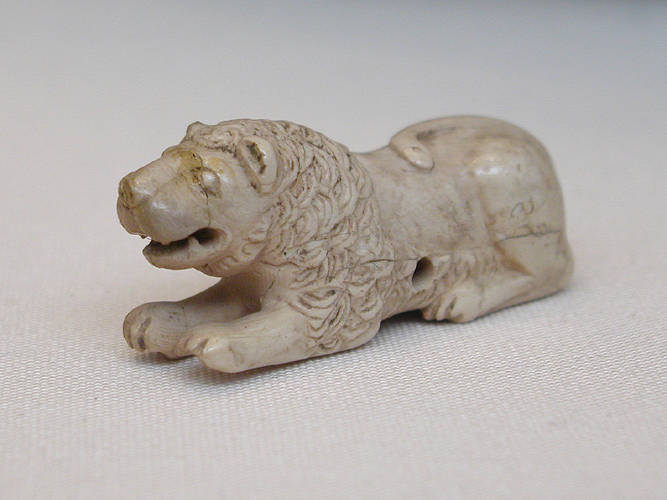
Old Kingdom gaming piece of ivory. Set of 6, 3 lions, and 3 bulldogs; Abu Rouash, Tomb M, 1st Dynasty, 3.5 × 6.5 cm, Cairo Museum

== See also ==
- Gardiner's Sign List#Y. Writings, Games, Music
- List of Egyptian hieroglyphs
