= Knot (hieroglyph) =

Egyptian hieroglyph

S24
Knot
in hieroglyphs

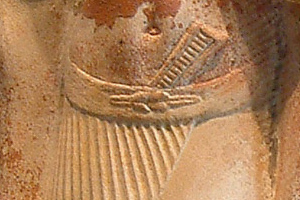
Statue of Raherka, 2350BC, 4th/5th Dynasty.

The ancient Egyptian knot hieroglyph, or girdle knot, Gardiner sign listed no. S24, portrays a reef knot. Besides its use as a hieroglyph, it has usage in statuary and reliefs. The knot hieroglyph is also an amulet, typically made of worked stone, or as jewellery elements.

== Language usage ==
The knot hieroglyph is used in the Egyptian language as the verb, (th)s, (th)ss, for to knot, to tie, to tie together, etc.

V13 S24 O34 V13 O34 O34 S24

It is used as the phonogram for (th)s, as well as the determinative. There are many alternate spellings. For the noun, it is Egyptian language (th)s, (th)s.t,

S24 X1 Z1 S24 Z1 S24 O34 Z7 D40 S24 O34 G43 F41

for meanings of: knot, tie, ligature, backbone, vertebrae, spine, etc.

== In jewellery and decoration ==
The knot used as an article of jewellery was especially known in the Middle Kingdom. It can be found in necklaces (see gallery photo), and as a small brooch. In Amulets of Ancient Egypt, a two-part, hollow gold piece is shown, with a detailed rope-detailed fiber; it is made with a tongue and groove closure for the parts.

Preceded by S15 to glitter -- -- (th)hn	S24 knot -- -- (th)s	Succeeded by U40 to lift up -- -- (th)sy

== Gallery ==
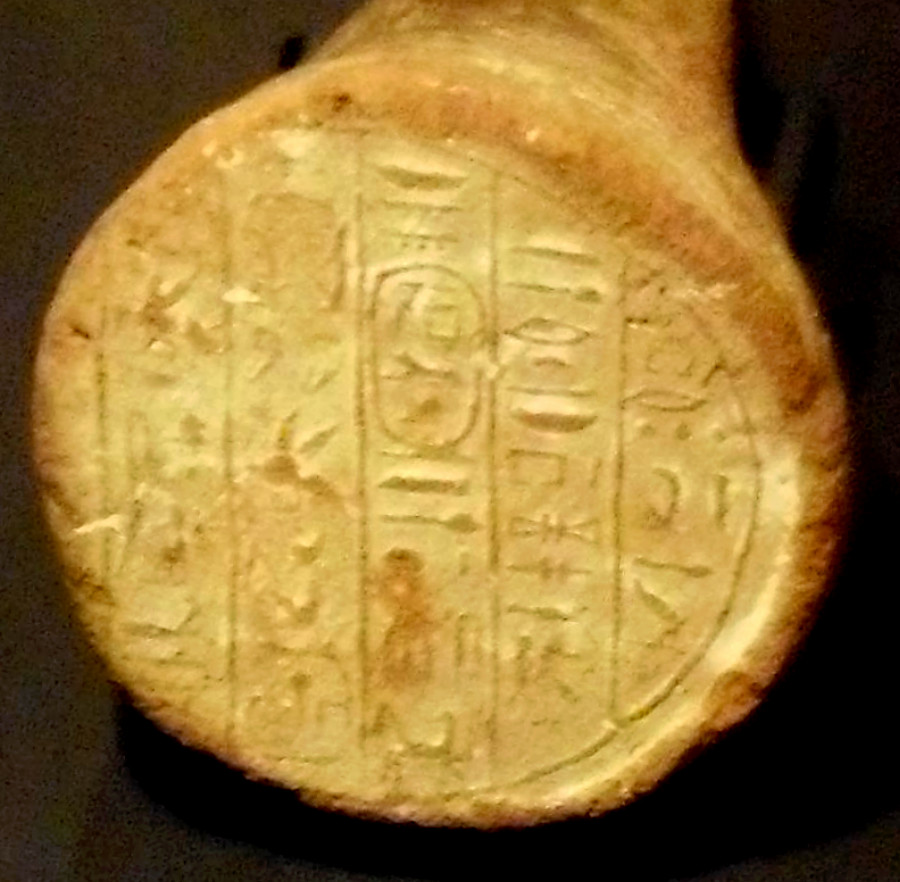
Funerary cone using the 'girdle-knot hieroglyph'

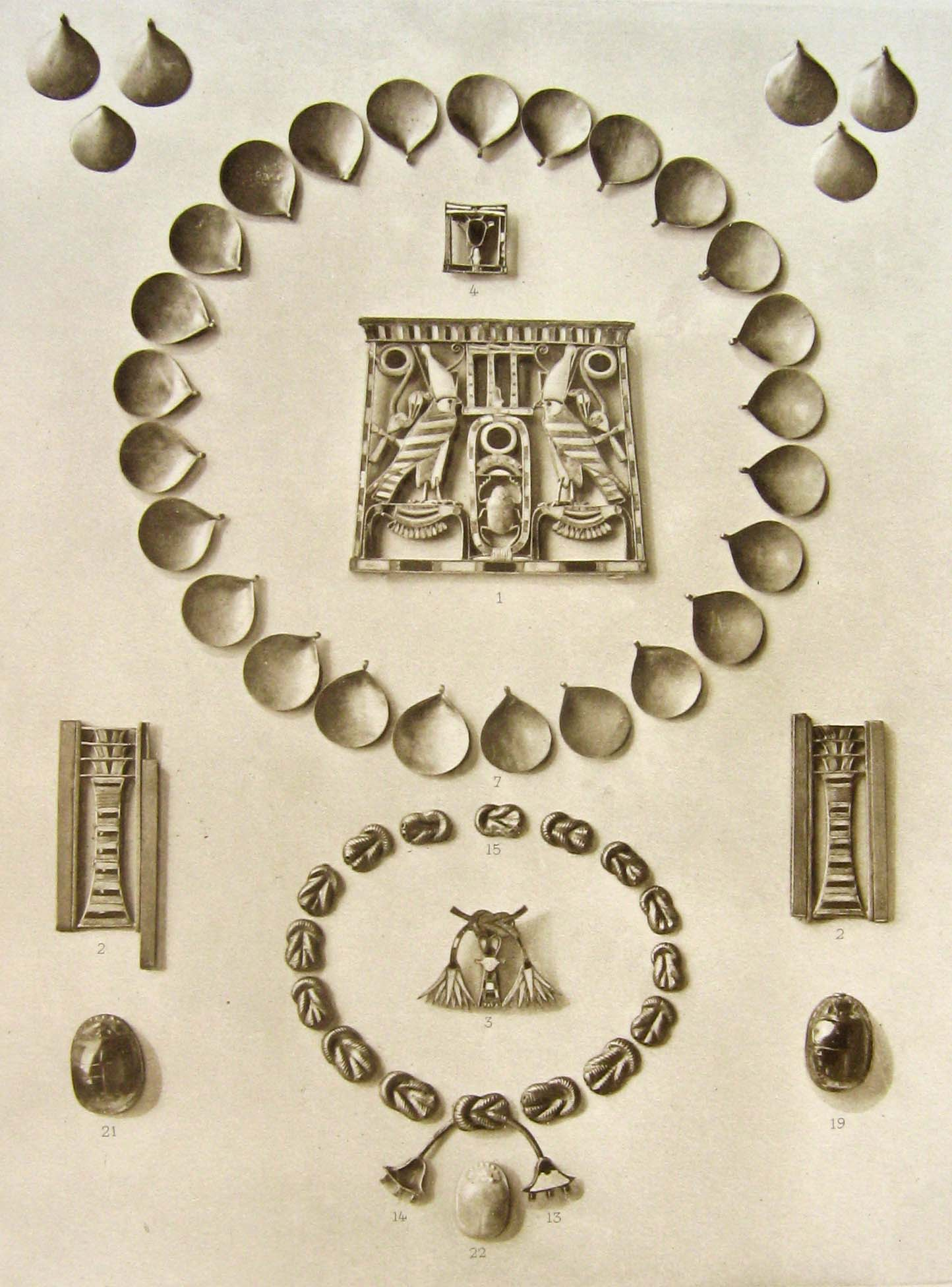
Small bandlet made of 16 knot-pieces

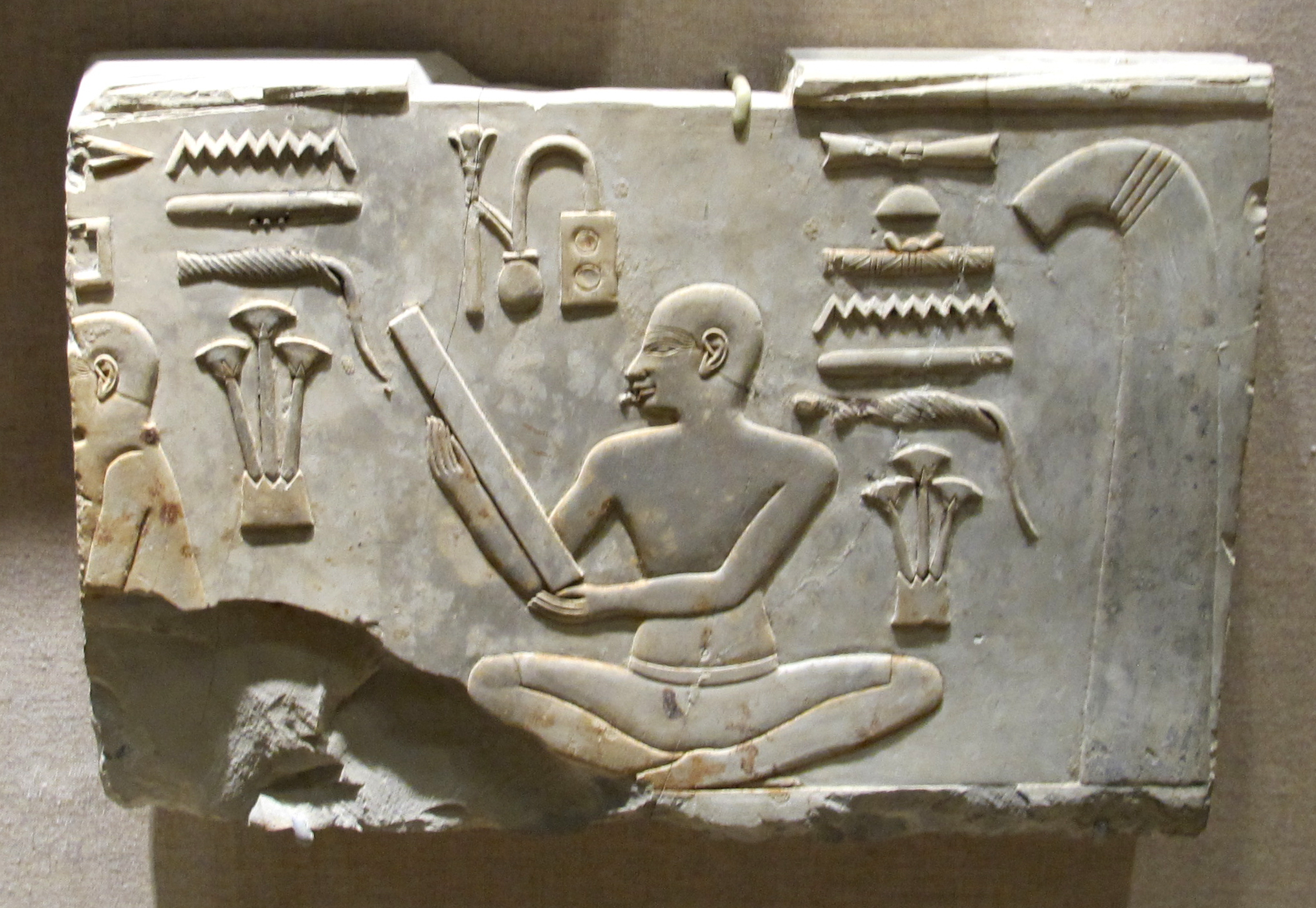
Relief from reign of Hatshepsut

== See also ==
- Gardiner's Sign List#S. Crowns, Dress, Staves, etc.
- List of Egyptian hieroglyphs
- Square knot
- Girdle of Isis
