= Illustrated Hieroglyphics Handbook =

Book on Egyptian hieroglyphs

The Illustrated Hieroglyphics Handbook is part of a new genre of books focused on Egyptian hieroglyphs. The book is a graphics based book with four to seven word examples of each Egyptian hieroglyph; the words are graphically explained for each component of the word, and links to the other entries in the book; each hieroglyph is in extreme-artistic-detail and can vary for each hieroglyph, word-to-word. The determinatives ending a word are explained, (if there is one). Some determinatives are specific to individual trades, i.e. metallurgy, for example and are not in the Gardiner's sign list of Egyptian hieroglyphs.

== Book layout ==
The core of the book is based on the Egyptian language, with a chapter each for:

- Egyptian uniliteral signs, U1 to U26
- Egyptian biliteral signs, B1 to B83
- Egyptian triliteral signs, T1 to T30

Each hieroglyph is examined with: Phonetics and Writing, (the four to seven example graphically displayed words), and, Semantics. The semantics may tell its history, or some of the complexities dealing with multiple uses or unknown understandings about the hieroglyph.

=== Other topics, subsections ===
Other subsections:

- Introduction
- The Magic Palettes of Thot(h)
- International Conventions for the Pseudo-Alphabet
- General Considerations on Hieroglyphic Writing; (introduces and explains the quadrat (hieroglyph block)).
- Summary List of Hieroglyphic Signs
- The Sounds of the Pseudo-Alphabet
- Translation Symbols and their IPA Equivalents-(International Phonetic Alphabet)
- Chronological and Cultural Milestones
- Acknowledgments/About the Authors
- Index of Hieroglyphic Images
- Index

=== Typographical Errors ===
There are some printing errors on page 155 and 157. The words at top of each plate is swapped with the words from the other page. Each plate is labeled with a proposed pronunciation, the translation(s), and transcription. The "Phonetics and Writing" description on the corresponding preceding page match the hieroglyphs. The give away is that page 154 list the determinative for disease/pain as a sparrow, but the hieroglyph plate is labeled as "jar". Then on page 156 the determinative for milk jar is a vase, which is clearly seen in the hieroglyph, but the plate is labeled "disease, pain".
