= Hippopotamus (hieroglyph) =

Egyptian hieroglyph

E25
Hippo-
potamus

db
in hieroglyphs

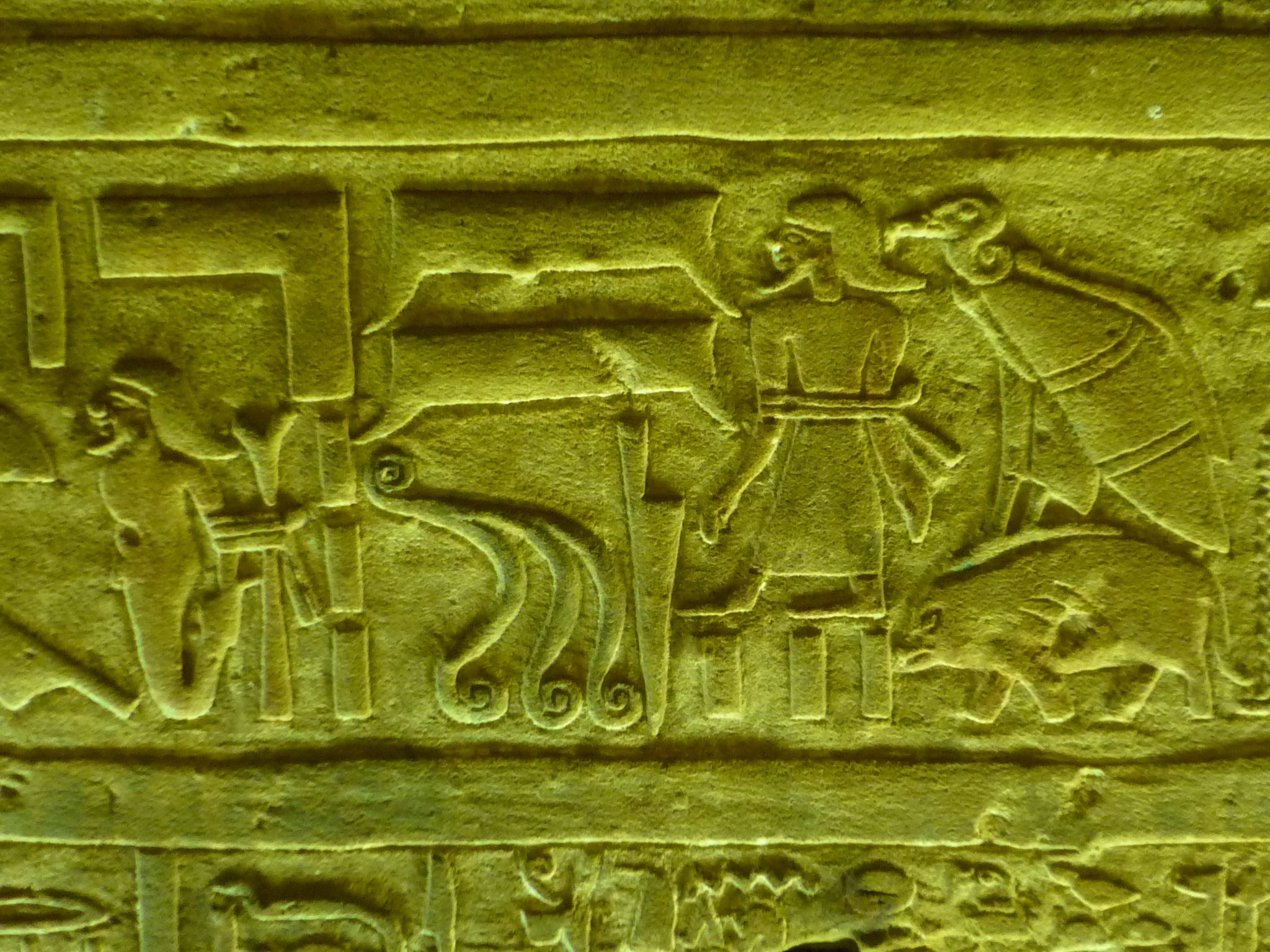
Temple relief from Edfu.

The Hippopotamus hieroglyph is Gardiner sign listed no. E25, in the category of mammals. It is used in Egyptian hieroglyphs as a determinative in words designating the animal, in Egyptian as db, and kh3b.

The hieroglyph shows the massiveness of the hippo's body, on its short legs. In Late Period Egypt, it was also used for words related to "heavy" (namely dns, udn-(wdn)).

== Palermo Stone usage, 2392 BC ==
On the Palermo piece-(obverse) of the 7-piece Palermo Stone of the 24th to 23rd century BC, it can be found in a year-register claiming the King (pharaoh) went on a hippopotamus hunt using "hide with arrow" (F29), F29

== See also ==
- Gardiner's Sign List#E. Mammals
