= Arm, cubit symbol (hieroglyph) =

D42
Arm
(Palm-down)
Cubit

meḥ
in hieroglyphs

The Arm, palm down or cubit hieroglyph (Gardiner D42) has the phonetic value mḥ. A variant with the upper arm "slanted" is D41. It represents the Egyptian cubit (about 20 inches).

== See also ==
- Gardiner's Sign List#D. Parts of the Human Body
- List of Egyptian hieroglyphs
- Ancient Egyptian units of measurement#Length
