= Tyet =

Egyptian hieroglyph

A tyet

V39
tjt
Knot of Isis
in hieroglyphs

The tyet (Ancient Egyptian: tjt), sometimes called the knot of Isis or girdle of Isis, is an ancient Egyptian symbol that came to be connected with the goddess Isis. Its hieroglyphic depiction is catalogued as V39 in Gardiner's sign list.

== History ==
In many respects the tyet resembles an ankh, except that its arms curve down. Its meaning is also reminiscent of the ankh, as it is often translated to mean "welfare" or "life".

The tyet resembles a knot of cloth and may have originally been a bandage used to absorb menstrual blood.

An early example of a tyet sign comes from a First Dynasty tomb at Helwan, excavated by Zaki Saad in the 1940s. This example predates the first written references to Isis and may not have been connected with her at the time. In later times, it came to be linked with her and with the healing powers that were an important aspect of her character.

Tyet amulets came to be buried with the dead in the early New Kingdom of Egypt (c. 1550–1070 BC). The earliest examples date to the reign of Amenhotep III, and from then until the end of dynastic Egyptian history, few people were buried without one placed within the mummy wrappings, usually on the upper torso. Ancient Egyptian funerary texts included many passages describing the use of different types of amulets and included spells to be recited over them. Chapter 156 of the Book of the Dead, a New Kingdom funerary text, calls for a tyet amulet made of red jasper to be placed at the neck of a mummy, saying "the power of Isis will be the protection of [the mummy's] body" and that the amulet "will drive away whoever would commit a crime against him." Such amulets were often made of red jasper or similarly colored materials, such as carnelian or red glass. However, many others were made of green materials such as Egyptian faience, whose color represented the renewal of life.

Another type of knot is sometimes called the "Isis knot": a large knot in a mantle worn by Egyptian women from the Late Period onward. It is associated with Isis because it often appeared on statues of her in Hellenistic and Roman times, but apart from the name it is not related to the tyet.

The tyet can be compared with the Minoan sacral knot, a symbol of a knot with a projecting loop found in Knossos, Crete.

== See also ==
- Knot (hieroglyph)

== Works cited ==
- Allen, James P. (2014-07-24). Middle Egyptian: An Introduction to the Language and Culture of Hieroglyphs. Cambridge University Press. ISBN 978-1-139-91709-4.
- Andrews, Carol (1994). Amulets of Ancient Egypt. University of Texas Press. ISBN 978-0-292-70464-0.
- Bianchi, Robert S. (1980). "Not the Isis-Knot". Bulletin of the Egyptological Seminar. 2.
- Goelet, Jr., Ogden; Faulkner, Raymond O.; Andrews, Carol A. R.; Gunther, J. Daniel; Wasserman, James (2015). The Egyptian Book of the Dead: The Book of Going forth by Day, Twentieth Anniversary Edition. Chronicle Books. ISBN 978-1-4521-4438-2.
- Griffiths, J. Gwyn (1980). The Origins of Osiris and His Cult. E.J. Brill. ISBN 978-90-04-06096-8.
- Griffiths, J. Gwyn (2001). "Isis". In Redford, Donald B. (ed.). The Oxford Encyclopedia of Ancient Egypt. Oxford University Press. ISBN 978-0-19-510234-5.
