= Egyptian Grammar (book) =

1927 book by Alan Gardiner

Egyptian Grammar Being an Introduction to the Study of Hieroglyphs
- Title page for Egyptian Grammar: Being an Introduction to the Study of Hieroglyphs (1950) second edition
- Author: Sir Alan Gardiner
- Language: English with Egyptian texts
- Subject: Egyptian language, Language
- Genre: Textbook
- Publisher: Clarendon Press, Oxford (1927, first edition); Ashmolean Museum, Oxford (1950, second edition, revised); Griffith Institute, Oxford (1957, third edition, revised)
- Publication date: 1927 (first edition); 1950 (second edition, fully revised); 1957 (third edition, revised)
- Pages: 646

Egyptian Grammar: Being an Introduction to the Study of Hieroglyphs is a 1927 book by English Egyptologist Alan Gardiner. First published in 1927 in London by the Clarendon Press, it has been reprinted several times since. The third edition, published in 1957, is the most widely used version for the subject. Through a series of 33 lessons, the book gives a very thorough overview of the language and writing system of ancient Egypt. The focus of the book is the literary language of the Middle Kingdom. The creation of the book resulted in the development of an accurate and detailed hieroglyphic typeset, Gardiner's Sign List.

Gardiner's work is considered to this day to be the most thorough textbook of the Egyptian language in existence, although subsequent developments have supplanted a number of aspects of Gardiner's understanding of Egyptian grammar, particularly with regard to the verbal system.

== Editions ==
- First edition (1927), Oxford: Clarendon Press. OL 6703756M
- Second edition, fully revised (1950), London: Published on behalf of the Griffith Institute, Ashmolean Museum, Oxford, by Oxford University Press. OL 6071866M
- Third edition, revised (1957), Oxford: Griffith Institute, ISBN 978-0-900416-35-4

== See also ==
- Gardiner's Sign List
