= Townsite-city-region (hieroglyph) =

Egyptian hieroglyph

O49
Townsite
City

Crossroads
"Intersection"
in hieroglyphs

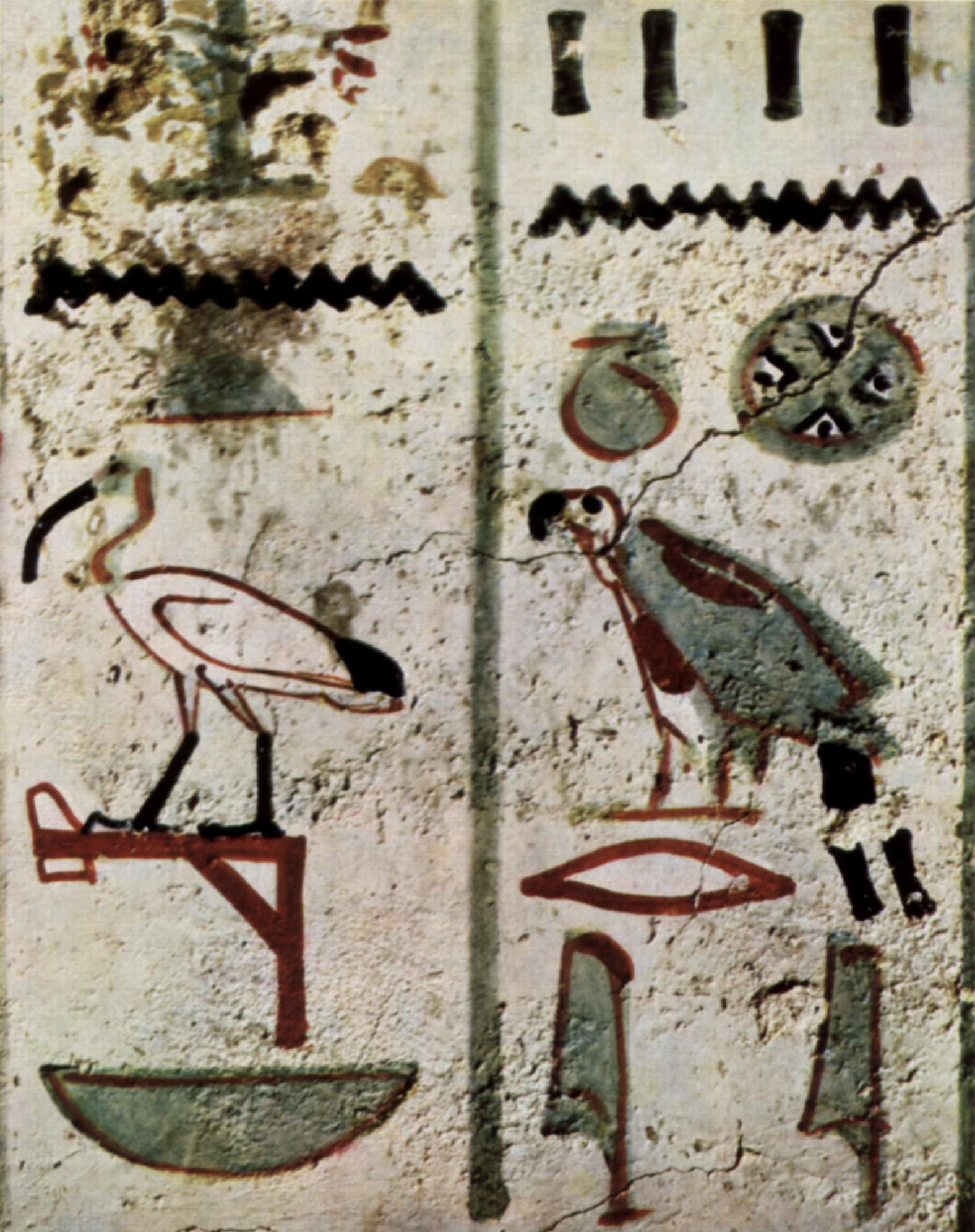
Painted wall relief: note that the Ibis, Mut (hieroglyph), Mouth, Iat standart (hieroglyph), and Townsite, all have white paint.

The Egyptian hieroglyph Townsite-city-region is Gardiner sign listed no. O49 for the intersection of a town's streets. In some Egyptian hieroglyph books it is called a city plan.

It is used in Egyptian hieroglyphs as a determinative in the names of town or city placenames. Also, as an ideogram in the Egyptian word "city", niwt.

== Origin and history ==
Betrò's modern Egyptian book, Hieroglyphics: The Writings of Ancient Egypt uses the "crossroads", "intersection" hieroglyph with the name of City Plan. The oldest use of placenames is from the original cosmetic palettes of the early years of Ancient Egypt. The Narmer Palette has a bull with a broken-open Fortress (hieroglyph) enclosure.O13 The Bull Palette contains two cities identified with internal iconographic hieroglyphs.

Betrò uses the Libyan Palette as her extensive explanation of the City Plan. The Libyan Palette contains seven cities, fortress-protected; the seven cities are identified inside an approximate–circular–enclosure with iconography, with some signs to become hieroglyphs, and similarly identified externally with the similar hieroglyphic iconography, also to be used as hieroglyphs. (see list: Libyan Palette)

The Fortress (hieroglyph) iconography was still being used in Ramesses II's time to identify placenames of defeated locations, referring to the Nine bows. The Fortress (hieroglyph) is shown in three non-Gardiner's sign listed forms-(all vertical); the category is Buildings and Parts of Buildings.

== See also ==
- Gardiner's Sign List#O. Buildings, Parts of Buildings, etc.
- List of Egyptian hieroglyphs
- Palermo Stone
