= Transliteration of Ancient Egyptian =

Ways to convert text in Ancient Egyptian language into modern alphabetic symbols

As used for Egyptology, transliteration of Ancient Egyptian is the process of converting (or mapping) texts written as Egyptian language symbols to alphabetic symbols representing uniliteral hieroglyphs or their hieratic and demotic counterparts. This process facilitates the publication of texts where the inclusion of photographs or drawings of an actual Egyptian document is impractical.

Transliteration is not the same as transcription. Transliteration is the representation of written symbols in a consistent way in a different writing system, while transcription indicates the pronunciation of a text. For the case of Ancient Egyptian, precise details of the phonology are not known completely. Transcription systems for Ancient Egyptian do exist, but they rely on linguistic reconstruction (depending on evidence from the Coptic language and other details) and are thus theoretical in nature. Egyptologists rely on transliteration in scientific publications. Egyptologists use the term "transcription" to describe the process of converting hieratic characters into hieroglyphic characters. In German-language literature, the terms "transcription" and "transliteration" are used in exactly the opposite way.

== Standards ==
As important as transliteration is for Egyptology, there is no one standard scheme in use for hieroglyphic and hieratic texts. However, there are a few closely related systems that can be regarded as conventional. Many non-German-speaking Egyptologists use the system described in Gardiner 1954, whereas many German-speaking scholars opt for that used in the Wörterbuch der aegyptischen Sprache (Dictionary of the Egyptian Language), 1926 and 1961 editions by Adolf Erman and Hermann Grapow, the standard dictionary of the ancient Egyptian language. However, there is a growing trend, even among English-speaking scholars, to adopt a modified version of the method used in the Wörterbuch (e.g., Allen 2000).

Although these conventional methods of transliteration have been used since the second half of the nineteenth century to the present time, there have been some attempts to adopt a modified system that seeks to use the International Phonetic Alphabet to a certain extent. The most successful of these is that developed by Wolfgang Schenkel (1990), and it is being used fairly widely in Germany and other German-speaking countries. More recent is a proposal by Thomas Schneider (2003) that is even closer to the IPA, but its usage is not presently common. The major criticism of both of these systems is that they give an impression of being scientifically accurate with regard to the pronunciation of Egyptian, though the actual accuracy is debatable. Moreover, the systems represent only the theoretical pronunciation of Middle Egyptian and not the older and later phases of the language, which are themselves to be transliterated with the same system.

=== Table of transliteration schemes ===
Although the system of Egyptian hieroglyphs is very complicated, there are only 24 consonantal phonemes distinguished, according to Edel (1955) transliterated and ordered alphabetically in the sequence:

ꜣ j ꜥ w b p f m n r h ḥ ḫ ẖ z s š q k g t ṯ d ḏ

A number of variant conventions are used interchangeably depending on the author.

The following table shows several transliteration schemes. The first column shows the uniliteral hieroglyph (see § Uniliteral signs below) corresponding to the sound.

Conventional Transliteration Schemes
Glyph	Brugsch	Erman	Budge	Erman & Grapow	Gardiner	Edel	Manuel de Codage	Hodge	Schenkel	Allen	Hoch	Schneider	Leiden Unified	Conventional Egyptological pronunciation
Glyph	1889	1894	1910	1926–1953	1957	1955	1988	1990	1991	2000	1997	2003	2023	Conventional Egyptological pronunciation
𓄿	ꜣ	ꜣ	a	ꜣ	ꜣ	ꜣ	A	ꜣ	ꜣ	ꜣ	ꜣ	ɹ	ꜣ	/ɑ, ɑː/
𓇋	ʾ	ı͗	ȧ	ı͗	ı͗	j	i	ʔ	ı͗	j	ı͗	ı͗	ı͗	/i, iː, j/
𓏭	"	ï	i	j	y	(n.a.)	y	y	ı͗	j	y	ı͗	ï	/iː/
𓇌	ʾʾ	y	i	j	y	j	y, i*i	y	y	y	y	y	y	/iː/
𓂝	ꜥ	ꜥ	ā	ꜥ	ꜥ	ꜥ	a	ꜥ	ꜥ	ꜥ	ꜥ	ɗ	ꜥ	/ɑː/
𓅱	w	w	u	w	w	w	w	w	w	w	w	w	w	/w, uː/
𓃀	b	b	b	b	b	b	b	b	b	b	b	b	b	/b/
𓊪	p	p	p	p	p	p	p	p	p	p	p	p	p	/p/
𓆑	f	f	f	f	f	f	f	f	f	f	f	f	f	/f/
𓅓	m	m	m	m	m	m	m	m	m	m	m	m	m	/m/
𓈖	n	n	n	n	n	n	n	n	n	n	n	n	n	/n/
𓂋	r, l	r	r, l	r	r	r	r	r	r	r	r	l	r	/ɾ/
𓉔	h	h	h	h	h	h	h	h	h	h	h	h	h	/h/
𓎛	ḥ	ḥ	ḥ	ḥ	ḥ	ḥ	H	ḥ	ḥ	ḥ	ḥ	ḥ	ḥ	/ħ, h/
𓐍	ḫ	ḫ	χ, kh	ḫ	ḫ	ḫ	x	x	ḫ	ḫ	ḫ	ḫ	ḫ	/x/
𓄡	ḫ	ḫ	χ, kh	ẖ	ẖ	ẖ	X	x̯	ẖ	ẖ	ẖ	ẖ	ẖ	/ç/
𓊃	s	s	s	s	s (z)	z	z	z	s	z	s	s	z	/z, s/
𓋴	s	s	s	ś	s (ś)	s	s	s	ś	s	s	ś	s	/s/
𓈙	š	š	ś, sh	š	š	š	S	š	š	š	š	š	š	/ʃ/
𓈎	ḳ	ḳ	q	ḳ	ḳ	q	q	q	ḳ	q	q	ḳ	q	/k, q/
𓎡	k	k	k	k	k	k	k	k	k	k	k	k	k	/k/
𓎼	g	g	ḳ	g	g	g	g	g	g	g	g	g	g	/ɡ/
𓏏	t	t	t	t	t	t	t	t	t	t	t	t	t	/t/
𓍿	ṯ	ṯ	θ, th	ṯ	ṯ	ṯ	T	č	č	ṯ	ṯ	c	ṯ	/tʃ/
𓂧	d	d	ṭ	d	d	d	d	d	ṭ	d	d	ḍ	d	/d/
𓆓	ḏ	ḏ	t', tch	ḏ	ḏ	ḏ	D	ǧ	č̣	ḏ	ḏ	c̣	ḏ	/dʒ/

The vowel /ɛ/ is conventionally inserted between consonants to make Egyptian words pronounceable in English.

=== Examples ===
The following text is transliterated below in some of the more common schemes. Note that most of the hieroglyphs in this text are not uniliteral signs, but can be found in the List of Egyptian hieroglyphs.

M23 X1 R4 X8 Q2 D4 W17 R14 G4 R8 O29 V30 U23 N26 D58 O49 Z1 F13 N31 Z2ss V30 N16 N21 Z1 D45 N25

Unicode: 𓇓𓏏𓐰𓊵𓏙𓊩𓐰𓁹𓏃𓋀𓅂𓊹𓉻𓐰𓎟𓍋𓈋𓃀𓊖𓐰𓏤𓄋𓐰𓈐𓏦𓎟𓐰𓇾𓐰𓈅𓐱𓏤𓂦𓐰𓈉

(This text is conventionally translated into English as "an offering that the king gives; and Osiris, Foremost of Westerners [i.e., the Dead], the Great God, Lord of Abydos; and Wepwawet, Lord of the Sacred Land [i.e., the Necropolis]." It can also be translated "a royal offering of Osiris, Foremost of the Westerners, the Great God, Lord of Abydos; and of Wepwawet, Lord of the Sacred Land" [Allen 2000:§24.10].)

Erman and Grapow 1926–1953

- ḥtp-dỉ-nśwt wśỉr ḫntj ỉmntjw nṯr ꜥꜣ nb ꜣbḏw wp-wꜣwt nb tꜣ ḏśr

Gardiner 1953

- ḥtp-dỉ-nsw wsỉr ḫnty ỉmntyw nṯr ꜥꜣ nb ꜣbḏw wp-wꜣwt nb tꜣ ḏsr

Buurman, Grimal, et al. 1988

- Htp-di-nswt wsir xnty imntyw nTr aA nb AbDw wp-wAwt nb tA Dsr

A fully encoded, machine-readable version of the same text is:

- M23-X1:R4-X8-Q2:D4-W17-R14-G4-R8-O29:V30-U23-N26-D58-O49:Z1-F13:N31-Z2-V30:N16:N21*Z1-D45:N25

Schenkel 1991

- ḥtp-dỉ-nsw wśỉr ḫntỉ ỉmntỉw nčr ꜥꜣ nb ꜣbč̣w wp-wꜣwt nb tꜣ č̣śr

Allen 2000

- ḥtp-dj-nswt wsjr ḫntj jmntjw nṯr ꜥꜣ nb ꜣbḏw wp-wꜣwt nb tꜣ ḏsr

Schneider 2003

- ḥtp-ḍỉ-nsw wśỉr ḫntỉ ỉmntỉw ncr ɗɹ nb ɹbc̣w wp-wɹwt nb tɹ c̣śr

Leiden 2023

- ḥtp-dỉ-nzw wsỉr ḫntï ỉmntïw nṯr ꜥꜣ nb ꜣbḏw wp-wꜣwt nb tꜣ ḏsr

=== Demotic ===
As the latest stage of pre-Coptic Egyptian, demotic texts have long been transliterated using the same system(s) used for hieroglyphic and hieratic texts. However, in 1980, Demotists adopted a single, uniform, international standard based on the traditional system used for hieroglyphic, but with the addition of some extra symbols for vowels and other letters that were written in the demotic script. The Demotic Dictionary of the Oriental Institute of the University of Chicago (or CDD) utilises this method. For details see the references below.

- Cenival, Françoise de (1980). "Unification des méthodes de translittération". Enchoria. 10: 2–4.
- Johnson, Janet H (1980). "CDDP Transliteration System". Enchoria. 10: 5–6.
- Johnson, Janet (2000). Thus wrote 'Onchsheshonqy: an introductory grammar of Demotic, Third Edition. Oriental Institute of the University of Chicago. ISBN 978-0-918986-49-8.
- Tait, William John (1982). "The Transliteration of Demotic". Enchoria. 11: 67–76.
- Thissen, Heinz-Josef (1980). "Zur Transkription demotischer Texte". Enchoria. 10: 7–9.

== Encoding ==
In 1984 a standard, ASCII-based transliteration system was proposed by an international group of Egyptologists at the first Table ronde informatique et égyptologie and published in 1988 (see Buurman, Grimal, et al., 1988). This has come to be known as the Manuel de Codage (or MdC) system, based on the title of the publication, Inventaire des signes hiéroglyphiques en vue de leur saisie informatique: Manuel de codage des textes hiéroglyphiques en vue de leur saisie sur ordinateur. It is widely used in e-mail discussion lists and internet forums catering to professional Egyptologists and the interested public.

Although the Manuel de codage system allows for simple "alphabetic" transliterations, it also specifies a complex method for electronically encoding complete ancient Egyptian texts, indicating features such as the placement, orientation, and even size of individual hieroglyphs. This system is used (though frequently with modifications) by various computer programs developed for typesetting hieroglyphic texts (such as SignWriter, WinGlyph, MacScribe, InScribe, Glyphotext, WikiHiero, and others).

The IETF language tag list establishes the code egy-mdctrans and egy-Latn-mdctrans for transliteration of Ancient Egyptian encoded according to the Manuel, and egy-leidentr (egy-Latn-leidentr) for Leiden Unified Transliteration.

=== Unicode ===
With the introduction of the Latin Extended Additional block to Unicode version 1.1 (1992), the addition of Egyptological alef and ayin to Unicode version 5.1 (2008) and the addition of Glottal I alias Egyptological yod to Unicode version 12.0 (2019), it is now possible to fully transliterate Egyptian texts using a Unicode typeface. The following table lists only the special characters used for various transliteration schemes (see above).

Transcription characters in Unicode
Minuscule	ꜣ	ʾ	ꞽ	i̯	ï	ꜥ	u̯	ḥ	ḫ	ẖ	h̭
Unicode	U+A723	U+02BE	U+A7BD	U+0069; U+032F	U+00EF	U+A725	U+0075; U+032F	U+1E25	U+1E2B	U+1E96	U+0068; U+032D
Majuscule	Ꜣ		Ꞽ			Ꜥ		Ḥ	Ḫ	H̱	H̭
Unicode	U+A722		U+A7BC			U+A724		U+1E24	U+1E2A	U+0048; U+0331	U+0048; U+032D
Minuscule	ś	š	ḳ	č	ṯ	ṭ	ṱ	č̣	ḏ		
Unicode	U+015B	U+0161	U+1E33	U+010D	U+1E6F	U+1E6D	U+1E71	U+010D; U+0323	U+1E0F		
Majuscule	Ś	Š	Ḳ	Č	Ṯ	Ṭ	Ṱ	Č̣	Ḏ		
Unicode	U+015A	U+0160	U+1E32	U+010C	U+1E6E	U+1E6C	U+1E70	U+010C; U+0323	U+1E0E		
Brackets/ interpunction	⸗	⟨	⟩	⸢	⸣						
Unicode	U+2E17	U+27E8	U+27E9	U+2E22	U+2E23						

==== Egyptological alef, ayin, and yod ====
Three characters that are specific to the discipline are required for transliterating Egyptian:

- Alef (two alephs, one set over the other (Lepsius); approximated by the digit ⟨3⟩ in ASCII);
- Ayin (an ayin);
- Yod (i with an aleph instead of the dot, both yod and alef being considered possible sound values in the 19th century).

Although three Egyptological and Ugariticist letters were proposed in August 2000, it was not until 2008 (Unicode 5.1) two of the three letters were encoded: aleph and ayin (minor and capital). Another two proposals were made regarding the Egyptological yod, the eventual result of which was to accept the use of the Cyrillic psili pneumata (U+0486 ◌҆ COMBINING CYRILLIC PSILI PNEUMATA) as one of several possible diacritics for this purpose. The other options use the superscript comma (U+0313) and the right half ring above (U+0357). A new attempt for a sign called LETTER I WITH SPIRITUS LENIS was made in 2017. Within the Egyptological community objections were made concerning this name. The proposed name was changed to EGYPTOLOGICAL YOD before finally becoming GLOTTAL I. The sign was added in March 2019 with the release of Unicode 12.0. One of the first fonts that implemented the full set of signs is New Athena Unicode.

Designation	Lowercase	Capital
Egyptological alef	ꜣ U+A723	Ꜣ U+A722
Egyptological ayin	ꜥ U+A725	Ꜥ U+A724
Egyptological yod	ꞽ U+A7BD	Ꞽ U+A7BC

Before the usage of the above-mentioned Unicode signs, various workarounds were in practice, e.g.

Egyptological workarounds
Designation	Lowercase	Capital
Middle English yogh	ȝ U+021D	
Reverse sicilicus	ʿ U+02BF	
Right half ring above	i͗ U+0069 U+0357	I͗ U+0049 U+0357
Right half ring above	ı͗ U+0131 U+0357	I͗ U+0049 U+0357
I with hook above	ỉ U+1EC9	Ỉ U+1EC8
Cyrillic psili pneumata	i҆ U+0069 U+0486	I҆ U+0049 U+0486
Superscript comma	i̓ U+0069 U+0313	I̓ U+0049 U+0313

== Uniliteral signs ==
Middle Egyptian is reconstructed as having had 24 consonantal phonemes. There is at least one hieroglyph with a phonetic value corresponding to each of these phonemes.

The table below gives a list of such "uniliteral signs" along with their conventional transcription and their conventional "Egyptological pronunciation" and probable phonetic value.

Many hieroglyphs are coloured, though the paint has worn off most stone inscriptions. Colors vary, but many glyphs are predominantly one colour or another, or a particular combination (such as red on the top and blue on the bottom). In some cases, two graphically similar glyphs may be distinguished solely by colour, though in other cases it is not known if the choice of colour had any meaning.

Uniliteral signs
Sign			Egyptological transliteration and pronunciation			Phonetic values (IPA)	
Hieroglyph	Sign Colour	Depiction	Transliteration	Say (modern)	Notes	Old Egyptian	Middle Egyptian
𓄿	Polychrome	Egyptian vulture	ꜣ	ah	Called alef/aleph or hamza, a glottal stop	some form of liquid; proposed values include /ʀ/, /r/, /l/, /ɫ/	variously /ʀ/, /ʔ/, and /j/
𓇋	Green	Flowering reed	ꞽ or j	ee	Called yod	/j/ or /ʔ/ (?)	
𓇌	Green	Pair of reeds	y or j	y or ee	Called yod or y	/j/	
𓏭	Blue	Pair of strokes	y or ꞽ or j or ï	y or ee		not used	/j/ or /i/ (?)
𓂝	Red	Forearm	ꜥ	ah	Called ayin	/ʕ/, or debatably /d/	/ʕ/; /d/ perhaps retained in some words and dialects
𓅱	Yellow	Quail chick or its hieratic abbreviation	w	w or oo	Called wau/waw	/w/	
𓏲	Yellow	Quail chick or its hieratic abbreviation	w	w or oo	Called wau/waw	/w/	
𓃀	Red	Lower leg	b			/b/	
𓊪	Green	Reed mat or stool	p			/p/	
𓆑	Yellow	Horned viper	f			/f/	
𓅓	Yellow	Owl	m			/m/	
𓈖	Black	Ripple of water	n			/n/	
𓋔	Red	red crown	n			/n/	
𓂋	Red	Human mouth	r			/ɾ/, sometimes /l/ (dialectally always /l/)	variously /ɾ/, /l/, /j/, ∅ (dialectally /l/, /j/, ∅)
𓉔	Blue	Reed shelter	h	h		/h/	
𓎛	Green	Twisted wick	ḥ	h	An emphatic h, a voiceless pharyngeal fricative, called second H, dotted H	/ħ/	
𓐍	Green	Sieve or placenta	ḫ	kh	Voiceless velar fricative, called third H	/χ/ ~ /x/, or speculatively /ɣ/(?)	
𓄡	Attested in multiple colors	Animal belly and tail	ẖ	kh; hy as in human	A softer sound, a voiceless palatal fricative, called fourth H	/ç/, or speculatively /x/(?)	
𓊃	Red	Door bolt	z or s	z/s		very unclear; proposed values include /z/, /t͡s/, /sʼ/, /θ/	/s/
𓋴	Red	Folded cloth	s or ś	s		/s/	
𓈙	Blue	Garden pool	š	sh	Called shin	/ʃ/	
𓈚	Blue	Garden pool	š	sh	Called shin	/ʃ/	
𓈛	Blue	Garden pool	š	sh	Called shin	/ʃ/	
𓈜	Blue	Garden pool	š	sh	Called shin	/ʃ/	
𓈎	Blue	Hill slope	ḳ or q	q	An emphatic k, a voiceless uvular plosive, called Q or dotted k	/kʼ/ or /qʼ/(?) (exact phonetic distinction from ⟨g⟩ unclear)	
𓎡	Green	Basket with handle	k			/k/	
𓎢	Green	Basket with handle	k			/k/	
𓎽	Red	Jar stand	g			/kʼ/ or /g/(?) (exact phonetic distinction from ⟨q⟩ unclear)	
𓎼	Red	Jar stand	g			/kʼ/ or /g/(?) (exact phonetic distinction from ⟨q⟩ unclear)	
𓏏	Blue	Bread loaf	t			/t/	/t/ ~ ∅
𓍿	Green	Tethering rope or hobble	ṯ or č	ch	Called second T	/c/	/c/ ~ /t/ ~ ∅
𓂧	Red	Hand	d or ṭ	d		/tʼ/	
𓆓	Yellow	Cobra	ḏ or č̣	j	Called second D	/cʼ/	/cʼ/ ~ /tʼ/

== See also ==
- Egyptian biliteral signs – Hieroglyphs representing two consonants
- Egyptian triliteral signs – Hieroglyphs representing three consonants
- List of Egyptian hieroglyphs
