= B (hieroglyph) =

Egyptian hieroglyph

D58
Foot
in hieroglyphs

The ancient Egyptian b-hieroglyph (Gardiner D58) represents a foot or lower leg.

== Gallery ==
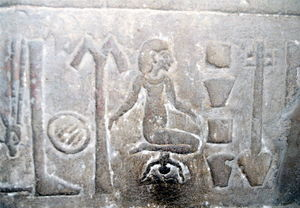
Relief
(also shows 3rd "m"
vertical Baker's tool (hieroglyph)
(mostly used as preposition))

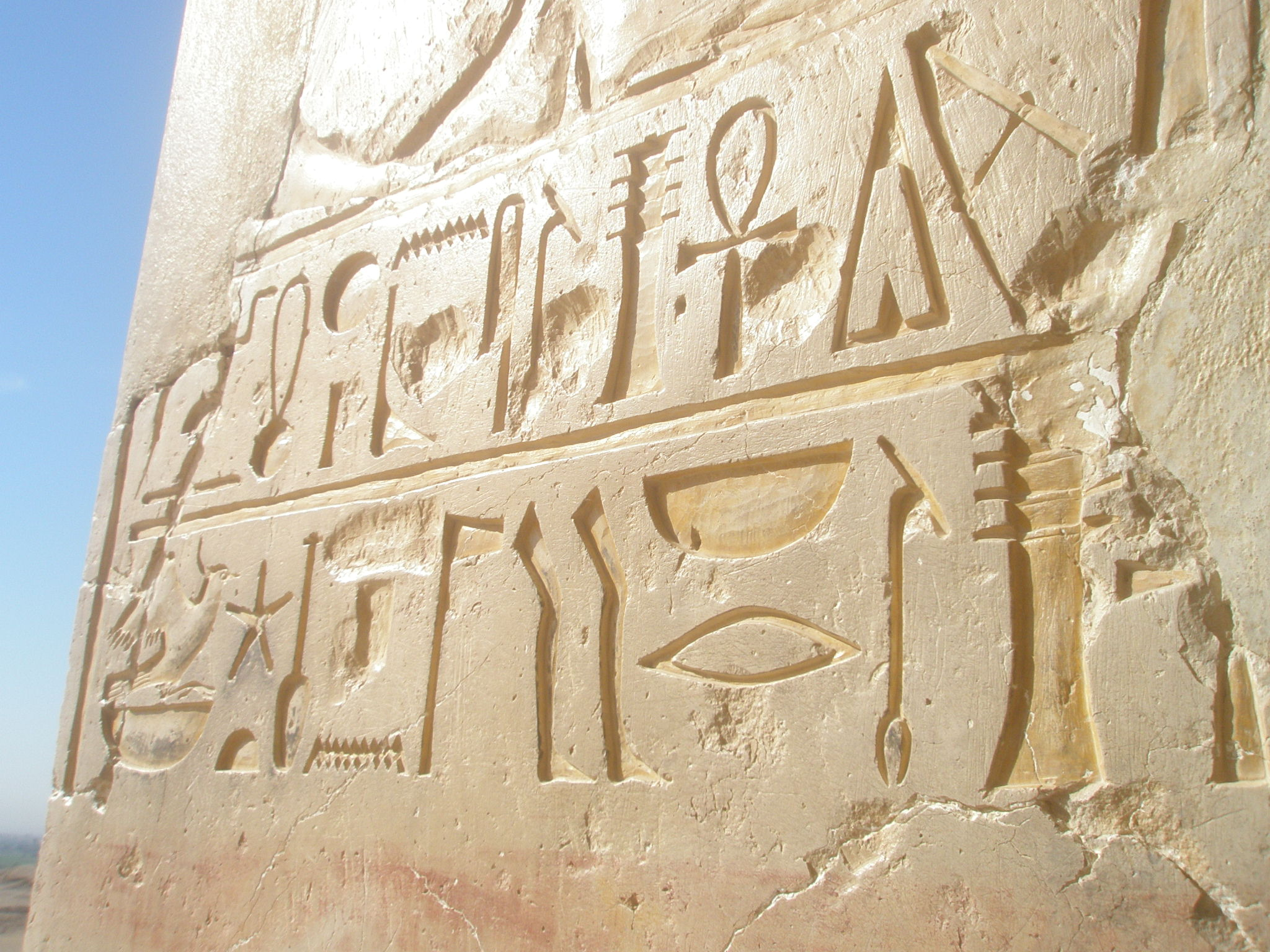
External wall relief; (foot and leg hieroglyphs)

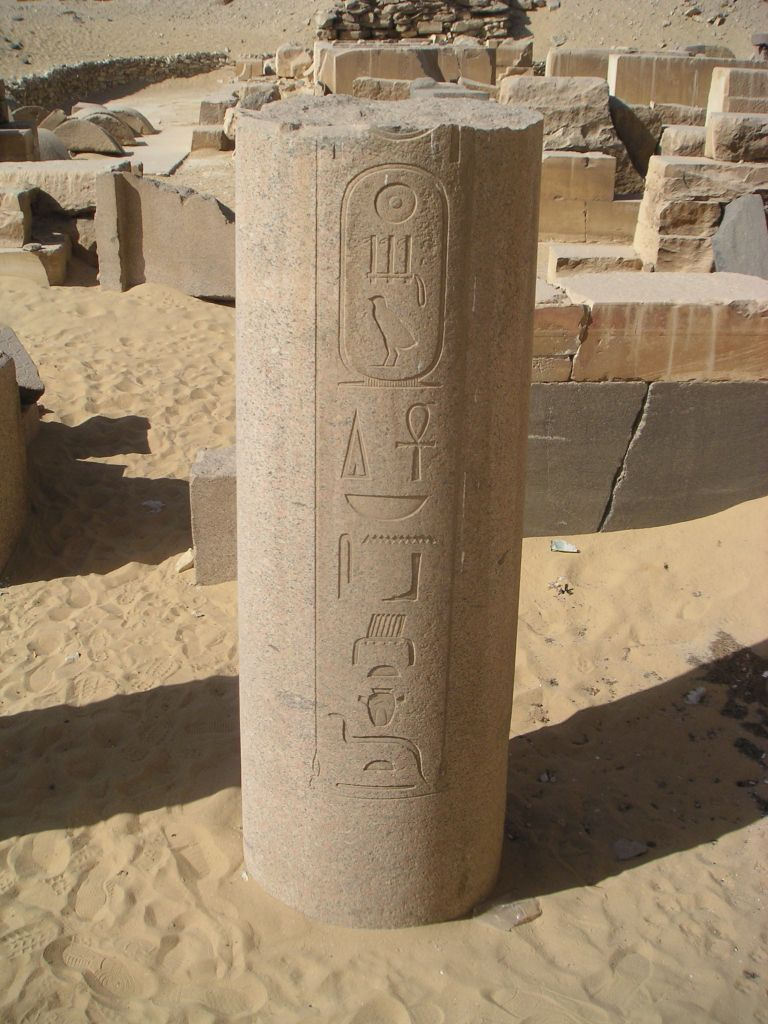
Column relief

== See also ==
- Gardiner's Sign List#D. Parts of the Human Body
- List of Egyptian hieroglyphs
