= Egyptian Hieroglyph N035 =

Egyptian hieroglyph

N35
"water"
in hieroglyphs

𓈖 (U+13216, Gardiner N35) is the Egyptian "water ripple" hieroglyph. See:

- List of Egyptian hieroglyphs#N for its list entry
- Egyptian unilateral signs for its role as phonetic sign for n
- Egyptian_language#Prepositions for its role as preposition
- M#History for its role as historical origin of the letter M

== See also ==
- Nu (god of primeval waters)
- Deshret (alternative n sign)
- Gardiner's Sign List
