= Gardiner's sign list =

Standard reference in the study of Ancient Egyptian hieroglyphs

Gardiner's sign list is a list of common Egyptian hieroglyphs compiled by Sir Alan Gardiner and first published as an appendix to his Egyptian Grammar (1927). It is considered a standard reference in the study of ancient Egyptian hieroglyphs.

Gardiner lists only the common forms of Egyptian hieroglyphs, but he includes extensive subcategories, and also both vertical and horizontal forms for many hieroglyphs. He includes size-variation forms to aid with the reading of hieroglyphs in running blocks of text. In contrast, for example, the Budge Reference has about 1,000 hieroglyphs listed in 50 pages, but with no size variations.

Gardiner does not cross-index signs; once a sign is put on one of his lists, other significant uses may be overlooked. One example of this is 𓅒 G16, nbtỉ, the ideogram for the Two Ladies, goddesses Wadjet as the cobra and Nekhbet as the white vulture. These are the protective and patron goddesses of the separate Egyptian kingdoms that joined into ancient Egypt, who were both then displayed on the uraeus of Wadjet when the unification occurred and afterward considered jointly to be the protectors of Egypt and the pharaohs. This ideogram is listed only in the bird list (G), and overlooked on the deity list (C) and the reptile list (I).

Other subcategories included by Gardiner are abbreviations and personalized forms, and also a complete subset, used on papyrus, specifically for the Book of the Dead.

== Categories ==
=== A. Man and his occupations ===
56 signs in Gardiner (1957:242–247), with A59 "man threatening with stick" inserted after A25 "man striking with left hand hanging behind back", and two variants A14* "blood interpreted as ax" of A14 "man with blood streaming from his head"; and A17* "child sitting with arms hanging down" of A17 "child sitting with hand to mouth".

| A1; A1 | A2; A2 | A3; A3 | A4; A4 | A5; A5 | A6; A6 | A7; A7 | A8; A8 | A9; A9 | A10; A10 |
| A11; A11 | A12; A12 | A13; A13 | A14; A14 | A15; A15 | A16; A16 | A17; A17 | A18; A18 | A19; A19 | A20; A20 |
| A21; A21 | A22; A22 | A23; A23 | A24; A24 | A25; A25 | A26; A26 | A27; A27 | A28; A28 | A29; A29 | A30; A30 |
| A31; A31 | A32; A32 | A33; A33 | A34; A34 | A35; A35 | A36; A36 | A37; A37 | A38; A38 | A39; A39 | A40; A40 |
| A41; A41 | A42; A42 | A43; A43 | A44; A44 | A45; A45 | A46; A46 | A47; A47 | A48; A48 | A49; A49 | A50; A50 |
| A51; A51 | A52; A52 | A53; A53 | A54; A54 | A55; A55 | A56; A56 | A57 | A58 | A59; A59 | A60 |

=== B. Woman and her occupations ===
7 signs in Gardiner (1957:448).

| B1; B1 | B2; B2 | B3; B3 | B4; B4 | B5; B5 | B6; B6 | B7; B7 | B8; B8 | B9; B9 | B10; B10 |
| B11; B11 | B12; B12 | | | | | | | | |

=== C. Anthropomorphic deities ===
11 signs in Gardiner (1957:448f.) with the addition of five 19th Dynasty signs, C12 Amun, C17 Mont, C18 Tjanen, C19 and C20 Ptah.

| C1; C1 | C2; C2 | C3; C3 | C4; C4 | C5; C5 | C6; C6 | C7; C7 | C8; C8 | C9; C9 | C10; C10 |
| C11; C11 | C12; C12 | | | | | C17; C17 | C18; C18 | C19; C19 | C20; C20 |

=== D. Parts of the human body ===
Expected quantity: 63

| D1; D1 | D2; D2 | D3; D3 | D4; D4 | D5; D5 | D6; D6 | D7; D7 | D8; D8 | D9; D9 | D10; D10 |
| D11; D11 | D12; D12 | D13; D13 | D14; D14 | D15; D15 | D16; D16 | D17; D17 | D18; D18 | D19; D19 | D20; D20 |
| D21; D21 | D22; D22 | D23; D23 | D24; D24 | D25; D25 | D26; D26 | D27; D27 | D28; D28 | D29; D29 | D30; D30 |
| D31; D31 | D32; D32 | D33; D33 | D34; D34 | D35; D35 | D36; D36 | D37; D37 | D38; D38 | D39; D39 | D40; D40 |
| D41; D41 | D42; D42 | D43; D43 | D44; D44 | D45; D45 | D46; D46 | D47; D47 | D48; D48 | D49; D49 | D50; D50 |
| D51; D51 | D52; D52 | D53; D53 | D54; D54 | D55; D55 | D56; D56 | D57; D57 | D58; D58 | D59; D59 | D60; D60 |
| D61; D61 | D62; D62 | D63; D63 | D64 | D65 | D66 | D67 | D68 | D69 | D70 |

=== E. Mammals ===
Expected quantity: 34

| E1; E1 | E2; E2 | E3; E3 | E4; E4 | E5; E5 | E6; E6 | E7; E7 | E8; E8 | E9; E9 | E10; E10 |
| E11; E11 | E12; E12 | E13; E13 | E14; E14 | E15; E15 | E16; E16 | E17; E17 | E18; E18 | E19; E19 | E20; E20 |
| E21; E21 | E22; E22 | E23; E23 | E24; E24 | E25; E25 | E26; E26 | E27; E27 | E28; E28 | E29; E29 | E30; E30 |
| E31; E31 | E32; E32 | E33; E33 | E34; E34 | E35 | E36 | E37 | E38 | E39 | E40 |

=== F. Parts of mammals ===
Expected quantity: 52

| F1; F1 | F2; F2 | F3; F3 | F4; F4 | F5; F5 | F6; F6 | F7; F7 | F8; F8 | F9; F9 | F10; F10 |
| F11; F11 | F12; F12 | F13; F13 | F14; F14 | F15; F15 | F16; F16 | F17; F17 | F18; F18 | F19; F19 | F20; F20 |
| F21; F21 | F22; F22 | F23; F23 | F24; F24 | F25; F25 | F26; F26 | F27; F27 | F28; F28 | F29; F29 | F30; F30 |
| F31; F31 | F32; F32 | F33; F33 | F34; F34 | F35; F35 | F36; F36 | F37; F37 | F38; F38 | F39; F39 | F40; F40 |
| F41; F41 | F42; F42 | F43; F43 | F44; F44 | F45; F45 | F46; F46 | F47; F47 | F48; F48 | F49; F49 | F50; F50 |
| F51; F51 | F52; F52 | F53 | F54 | F55 | F56 | F57 | F58 | F59 | F60 |

=== G. Birds ===
Expected quantity: 54

| G1; G1 | G2; G2 | G3; G3 | G4; G4 | G5; G5 | G6; G6 | G7; G7 | G8; G8 | G9; G9 | G10; G10 |
| G11; G11 | G12; G12 | G13; G13 | G14; G14 | G15; G15 | G16; G16 | G17; G17 | G18; G18 | G19; G19 | G20; G20 |
| G21; G21 | G22; G22 | G23; G23 | G24; G24 | G25; G25 | G26; G26 | G27; G27 | G28; G28 | G29; G29 | G30; G30 |
| G31; G31 | G32; G32 | G33; G33 | G34; G34 | G35; G35 | G36; G36 | G37; G37 | G38; G38 | G39; G39 | G40; G40 |
| G41; G41 | G42; G42 | G43; G43 | G44; G44 | G45; G45 | G46; G46 | G47; G47 | G48; G48 | G49; G49 | G50; G50 |
| G51; G51 | G52; G52 | G53; G53 | G54; G54 | G55 | G56 | G57 | G58 | G59 | G60 |

=== H. Parts of birds ===
Expected quantity: 8

| H1; H1 | H2; H2 | H3; H3 | H4; H4 | H5; H5 | H6; H6 | H7; H7 | H8; H8 | H9 | H10 |

=== I. Amphibious animals, reptiles, etc. ===
15 signs in Gardiner (1957:475f).

| No. | img. | Unicode | phon. | description | usage, notes |
|---|---|---|---|---|---|
| I1 | I1 | 𓆈 U+13188 | ꜥšꜣ | lizard | "lizard" |
| I2 | I2 | 𓆉 U+13189 | | freshwater turtle | štjw "turtle" |
| I3 | I3 | 𓆊 U+1318A | ı͗t | crocodile | "crocodile" (ḫntj), "be greedy; lust after" (ḥnt), "voracious, angry", (ꜣd) |
| I4 | I4 | 𓆋 U+1318B | | crocodile on a shrine | Sobek |
| I5 | I5 | 𓆌 U+1318C | | crocodile with inward curved tail | "collect, gather" (sꜣq) |
| I6 | I6 | 𓆎 U+1318E | km | piece of crocodile-skin with spines | as phonogram in kmt "Egypt", skm "grey-haired" |
| I7 | I7 | 𓆏 U+1318F | | frog | "frog" (qrr), Heqet, ideogram in wḥm-ꜥnḫ "repeating life" |
| I8 | I8 | 𓆐 U+13190 | ḥfn | tadpole | |
| I9 | I9 | 𓆑 U+13191 | f | horned viper | |
| I10 | I10 | 𓆓 U+13193 | ḏ | cobra in repose | |
| I11 | I11 | 𓆕 U+13195 | ḏḏ | two cobras | |
| I12 | I12 | 𓆗 U+13197 | | cobra erect | Uraeus (iꜥrt), Nesret |
| I13 | I13 | 𓆘 U+13198 | | I12 + V30 | "goddess" |
| I14 | I14 | 𓆙 U+13199 | | snake | "snake" (ḏdft), "serpent" (ḥfꜣw) |
| I15 | I15 | 𓆚 U+1319A | | variant of I14 | |

=== K. Fish and parts of fish ===
Expected quantity: 7

| K1; K1 | K2; K2 | K3; K3 | K4; K4 | K5; K5 | K6; K6 | K7; K7 | K8 | K9 | K10 |

=== L. Invertebrates and lesser animals ===
Expected quantity: 7

| L1; L1 | L2; L2 | L3; L3 | L4; L4 | L5; L5 | L6; L6 | L7; L7 | L8 | L9 | L10 |

=== M. Trees and plants ===
44 signs in Gardiner (1957:478–484).

| M1; M1 | M2; M2 | M3; M3 | M4; M4 | M5; M5 | M6; M6 | M7; M7 | M8; M8 | M9; M9 | M10; M10 |
| M11; M11 | M12; M12 | M13; M13 | M14; M14 | M15; M15 | M16; M16 | M17; M17 | M18; M18 | M19; M19 | M20; M20 |
| M21; M21 | M22; M22 | M23; M23 | M24; M24 | M25; M25 | M26; M26 | M27; M27 | M28; M28 | M29; M29 | M30; M30 |
| M31; M31 | M32; M32 | M33; M33 | M34; M34 | M35; M35 | M36; M36 | M37; M37 | M38; M38 | M39; M39 | M40; M40 |
| M41; M41 | M42; M42 | M43; M43 | M44; M44 | | | | | | |

=== N. Sky, earth, water ===
42 signs in Gardiner (1957:485–492). N3 is an Old Kingdom variant of N2. N11 "moon" has vertical (increscent and decrescent) variants, N12 is a 19th-Dynasty variant of N11.

| No. | img. | Unicode | phon. | description | usage, notes |
|---|---|---|---|---|---|
| N1 | N1 | 𓇯 U+131EF | pt | sky | |
| N2 | N2 | 𓇰 U+131F0 | grḥ | sky with sceptre | det. for "darkness" |
| N3 | N3 | 𓇱 U+131F1 | as N2 | variant of N2 | Old Kingdom variant of N2 |
| N4 | N4 | 𓇲 U+131F2 | | moisture falling from the sky | "dew", "rain" |
| N5 | N5 | 𓇳 U+131F3 | rꜥ | sun | Main article: Ra |
| N6 | N6 | 𓇴 U+131F4 | rꜥ | sun with uraeus | 19th Dynasty |
| N7 | N7 | 𓇵 U+131F5 | | N5 + T28 | ẖrt-hrw "day-time" |
| N8 | N8 | 𓇶 U+131F6 | wbn | sunshine | Usually depicted with three rays, older variants may also have four rays. Determinative for e.g. pḥḏ "to shine, illumine" and wbn "rise"; from this latter case, it can also take the phonetic value of wbn when standing on its own, e.g. in wbn "wound". Alternatively, it is either a determiner or ideogram for ḥnmmt, the name of the "sun folk" of Heliopolis (Gardiner p. 486). A depiction with four rays is found on an ivory wand of c. 2100 BC: The "Sun with rays" hieroglyph is shown once, placed upon the head of a ram. It has a central dot, like the "Sun" hieroglyph (N5), with four elongated, undulating vertical rays. See also Aten. |
| N9 | N9 | 𓇷 U+131F7 | psḏ | moon with its lower half obscured | 18th Dynasty |
| N10 | N10 | 𓇸 U+131F8 | as N9 | variant of N9 | 18th Dynasty |
| N11 | N11 | 𓇹 U+131F9 | | crescent moon | |
| N12 | N12 | 𓇺 U+131FA | | variant of N11 | 18th Dynasty |
| N13 | N13 | 𓇻 U+131FB | | half of N11 + N14 | "half-month festival" |
| N14 | N14 | 𓇼 U+131FC | | star | |
| N15 | N15 | 𓇽 U+131FD | | star in circle | |
| N16 | N16 | 𓇾 U+131FE | | N18 + 3 x N33 | "earth, land" (flat alluvial land with grains of sand) |
| N17 | N17 | 𓇿 U+131FF | | variant of N16 | as N16 |
| N18 | N18 | 𓈀 U+13200 | ı͗ | sandy tract | "island" |
| N19 | N19 | 𓈃 U+13203 | | 2 x N18 | in ḥr-ꜣḫty "Horus-of-the-Horizon" |
| N20 | N20 | 𓈄 U+13204 | | tongue of land | "sand bank, shore" |
| N21 | N21 | 𓈅 U+13205 | | tongue of land | "bank, region" (in "two banks" = "Egypt") |
| N22 | N22 | 𓈆 U+13206 | | tongue of land | Old Kingdom predecessor of both N20 and N21 |
| N23 | N23 | 𓈇 U+13207 | | irrigation canal | differentiation of N36 |
| N24 | N24 | 𓈈 U+13208 | | land with irrigation tunnels | "district, nome" |
| N25 | N25 | 𓈉 U+13209 | | hills | "hill-country, foreign land" |
| N26 | N26 | 𓈋 U+1320B | ḏw | mountain | |
| N27 | N27 | 𓈌 U+1320C | | sun rising over mountain | "horizon" |
| N28 | N28 | 𓈍 U+1320D | ḫꜥ | sun rising over hill | |
| N29 | N29 | 𓈎 U+1320E | q | sandy hill-slope | |
| N30 | N30 | 𓈏 U+1320F | | mound with shrubs | "mound" |
| N31 | N31 | 𓈐 U+13210 | | road bordered by shrubs | "road" |
| N32 | N32 | 𓈑 U+13211 | | lump of clay or dung | Old Kingdom |
| N33 | N33 | 𓈒 U+13212 | | grain of sand | |
| N34 | N34 | 𓈔 U+13214 | | metal ingot | |
| N35 | N35 | 𓈖 U+13216 | n | ripple of water | variant "three ripples" 𓈗 U+13217 |
| N36 | N36 | 𓈘 U+13218 | | water channel | |
| N37 | N37 | 𓈙 U+13219 | | pool | "pool" |
| N38 | N38 | 𓈛 U+1321B | | variant of N37 | more detailed drawing of N37 |
| N39 | N39 | 𓈜 U+1321C | | garden pool full of water | variant of N37 |
| N40 | N40 | 𓈝 U+1321D | | N37 + D54 | "go" |
| N41 | N41 | 𓈞 U+1321E | bı͗ꜣ | well full of water | "well" |
| N42 | N42 | 𓈟 U+1321F | | variant of N41 | as N41 |

=== O. Buildings, parts of buildings, etc. ===
51 signs (with variants, U+13250–1329A).

| O1; O1 | O2; O2 | O3; O3 | O4; O4 | O5; O5 | O6; O6 | O7; O7 | O8; O8 | O9; O9 | O10; O10 |
| O11; O11 | O12; O12 | O13; O13 | O14; O14 | O15; O15 | O16; O16 | O17; O17 | O18; O18 | O19; O19 | O20; O20 |
| O21; O21 | O22; O22 | O23; O23 | O24; O24 | O25; O25 | O26; O26 | O27; O27 | O28; O28 | O29; O29 | O30; O30 |
| O31; O31 | O32; O32 | O33; O33 | O34; O34 | O35; O35 | O36; O36 | O37; O37 | O38; O38 | O39; O39 | O40; O40 |
| O41; O41 | O42; O42 | O43; O43 | O44; O44 | O45; O45 | O46; O46 | O47; O47 | O48; O48 | O49; O49 | O50; O50 |
O51; O51

=== P. Ships and parts of ships ===
Expected quantity: 11

| P1; P1 | P2; P2 | P3; P3 | P4; P4 | P5; P5 | P6; P6 | P7; P7 | P8; P8 | P9; P9 | P10; P10 |
| P11; P11 | P12 | P13; P13 | P14 | P15 | P16 | P17 | P18 | P19 | P20 |

=== Q. Domestics and funerary furniture ===
Expected quantity: 7

| Q1; Q1 | Q2; Q2 | Q3; Q3 | Q4; Q4 | Q5; Q5 | Q6; Q6 | Q7; Q7 | Q8 | Q9 | Q10 |

=== R. Temple furniture and sacred emblems ===
Expected quantity: 25

| R1; R1 | R2; R2 | R3; R3 | R4; R4 | R5; R5 | R6; R6 | R7; R7 | R8; R8 | R9; R9 | R10; R10 |
| R11; R11 | R12; R12 | R13; R13 | R14; R14 | R15; R15 | R16; R16 | R17; R17 | R18; R18 | R19; R19 | R20; R20 |
| R21; R21 | R22; R22 | R23; R23 | R24; R24 | R25; R25 | R26 | R27 | R28 | R29 | R30 |

=== S. Crowns, dress, staves, etc. ===
Expected quantity: 45

| S1; S1 | S2; S2 | S3; S3 | S4; S4 | S5; S5 | S6; S6 | S7; S7 | S8; S8 | S9; S9 | S10; S10 |
| S11; S11 | S12; S12 | S13; S13 | S14; S14 | S15; S15 | S16; S16 | S17; S17 | S18; S18 | S19; S19 | S20; S20 |
| S21; S21 | S22; S22 | S23; S23 | S24; S24 | S25; S25 | S26; S26 | S27; S27 | S28; S28 | S29; S29 | S30; S30 |
| S31; S31 | S32; S32 | S33; S33 | S34; S34 | S35; S35 | S36; S36 | S37; S37 | S38; S38 | S39; S39 | S40; S40 |
| S41; S41 | S42; S42 | S43; S43 | S44; S44 | S45; S45 | S46 | S47 | S48 | S49 | S50 |

=== T. Warfare, hunting, and butchery ===
Expected quantity: 35

| T1; T1 | T2; T2 | T3; T3 | T4; T4 | T5; T5 | T6; T6 | T7; T7 | T8; T8 | T9; T9 | T10; T10 |
| T11; T11 | T12; T12 | T13; T13 | T14; T14 | T15; T15 | T16; T16 | T17; T17 | T18; T18 | T19; T19 | T20; T20 |
| T21; T21 | T22; T22 | T23; T23 | T24; T24 | T25; T25 | T26; T26 | T27; T27 | T28; T28 | T29; T29 | T30; T30 |
| T31; T31 | T32; T32 | T33; T33 | T34; T34 | T35; T35 | T36 | T37 | T38 | T39 | T40 |

=== U. Agriculture, crafts, and professions ===
41 signs.

| U1; U1 | U2; U2 | U3; U3 | U4; U4 | U5; U5 | U6; U6 | U7; U7 | U8; U8 | U9; U9 | U10; U10 |
| U11; U11 | U12; U12 | U13; U13 | U14; U14 | U15; U15 | U16; U16 | U17; U17 | U18; U18 | U19; U19 | U20; U20 adze on block stp "cut", "choose" (stp-n-rꜣ "chosen of Ra") |
| U21; U21 | U22; U22 | U23; U23 | U24; U24 | U25; U25 | U26; U26 | U27; U27 | U28; U28 | U29; U29 | U30; U30 |
| U31; U31 | U32; U32 | U33; U33 | U34; U34 | U35; U35 | U36; U36 | U37; U37 | U38; U38 | U39; U39 | U40; U40 |
U41; U41

=== V. Rope, fiber, baskets, bags, etc. ===
40 signs (38 in Gardiner 1957). V39 is the Tyet or "Knot of Isis". V40 is the numeral 10 in dates.

| V1; V1 | V2; V2 | V3; V3 | V4; V4 | V5; V5 | V6; V6 | V7; V7 | V8; V8 | V9; V9 | V10; V10 |
| V11; V11 | V12; V12 | V13; V13 | V14; V14 | V15; V15 | V16; V16 | V17; V17 | V18; V18 | V19; V19 | V20; V20 |
| V21; V21 | V22; V22 | V23; V23 | V24; V24 | V25; V25 | V26; V26 | V27; V27 | V28; V28 | V29; V29 | V30; V30 |
| V31; V31 | V32; V32 | V33; V33 | V34; V34 | V35; V35 | V36; V36 | V37; V37 | V38; V38 | V39; V39 | V40 |

=== W. Vessels of stone and earthenware ===
25 signs.

| W1; W1 | W2; W2 | W3; W3 | W4; W4 | W5; W5 | W6; W6 | W7; W7 | W8; W8 | W9; W9 | W10; W10 |
| W11; W11 | W12; W12 | W13; W13 | W14; W14 | W15; W15 | W16; W16 | W17; W17 | W18; W18 | W19; W19 | W20; W20 |
| W21; W21 | W22; W22 | W23; W23 | W24; W24 | W25; W25 | | | | | |

=== X. Loaves and cakes ===
8 signs.

| X1; X1 t feminine | X2; X2 | X3; X3 bread | X4; X4 | X5; X5 bread, food | X6; X6 loaf (pAt) | X7; X7 half-loaf (gSw) | X8; X8 conical loaf; "give" (di, imi) |

=== Y. Writings, games, music ===
8 signs.

| Y1; Y1 | Y2; Y2 | Y3; Y3 | Y4; Y4 | Y5; Y5 | Y6; Y6 | Y7; Y7 | Y8; Y8 |

=== Z. Strokes, signs derived from Hieratic, geometrical figures ===
11 signs.

| Z1; Z1 | Z2; Z2 | Z3; Z3 | Z4; Z4 | Z5; Z5 | Z6; Z6 | Z7; Z7 | Z8; Z8 | Z9; Z9 | Z10; Z10 |
Z11; Z11

=== Aa. Unclassified ===
31 signs in Gardiner (1957).

| Aa1; Aa1 | Aa2; Aa2 | Aa3; Aa3 | Aa4; Aa4 | Aa5; Aa5 | Aa6; Aa6 | Aa7; Aa7 | Aa8; Aa8 | Aa9; Aa9 | Aa10; Aa10 |
| Aa11; Aa11 | Aa12; Aa12 | Aa13; Aa13 | Aa14; Aa14 | Aa15; Aa15 | Aa16; Aa16 | Aa17; Aa17 | Aa18; Aa18 | Aa19; Aa19 | Aa20; Aa20 |
| Aa21; Aa21 | Aa22; Aa22 | Aa23; Aa23 | Aa24; Aa24 | Aa25; Aa25 | Aa26; Aa26 | Aa27; Aa27 | Aa28; Aa28 | Aa29; Aa29 | Aa30; Aa30 |
| Aa31; Aa31 | Aa32; Aa32 | Aa33 | Aa34 | Aa35 | Aa36 | Aa37 | Aa38 | Aa39 | Aa40; Aa40 |
| Aa41; Aa41 | Aa42 | Aa43 | Aa44 | Aa45 | Aa46 | Aa47 | Aa48 | Aa49 | Aa50 |

== Unicode ==
𓁄o

A059: man threatening with stick
- In Unicode: U+13044 𓁄 EGYPTIAN HIEROGLYPH A059

These hieroglyphs have unicode code points and so, given a suitable font, can be displayed or printed. The block starts at U+013000 for A001.

== See also ==
- Egyptian hieroglyphs
- List of Egyptian hieroglyphs
- Transliteration of Ancient Egyptian

== Bibliography ==
- Budge, Sir E.A.Wallis, An Egyptian Hieroglyphic Dictionary, in Two Volumes, Sir E.A.Wallis Budge, (Dover Publications, Inc. New York), c 1920, Dover Edition, c 1978. (Large categorized listings of Hieroglyphs, Vol 1, pp. xcvii–cxlvii (97–147) (25 categories, 1000+ hieroglyphs), 50 pgs.)
- A.H. Gardiner, Catalogue of the Egyptian hieroglyphic printing type, from matrices owned and controlled by Dr. Alan (1928).
- A.H. Gardiner, "Additions to the new hieroglyphic fount (1928)", The Journal of Egyptian Archaeology 15 (1929), p. 95.
- A.H. Gardiner, "Additions to the new hieroglyphic fount (1931)", The Journal of Egyptian Archaeology 17 (1931), pp. 245–247.
- A.H. Gardiner, Supplement to the catalogue of the Egyptian hieroglyphic printing type, showing acquisitions to December 1953 (1953).
- A.H. Gardiner, Egyptian Grammar: Being an Introduction to the Study of Hieroglyphs. 3rd Ed., pub. Griffith Institute, Oxford, 1957 (1st edition 1927), pp. 438–548 (pdf).
- Wilkinson, Richard, Reading Egyptian Art, A Hieroglyphic Guide to Ancient Egyptian Painting and Sculpture, Richard H. Wilkinson, with 450 Illustrations, (Thames & Hudson Ltd, London), c 1992.
