= Determinative =

Symbol in a logogram indicating meaning

A determinative, also known as a taxogram or semagram, is an ideogram used to mark semantic categories of words in logographic scripts which helps to disambiguate interpretation. They have no direct counterpart in spoken language, though they may derive historically from glyphs for real words, and functionally they resemble classifiers in East Asian and sign languages. For example, Egyptian hieroglyphic determinatives include symbols for divinities, people, parts of the body, animals, plants, and books or abstract ideas, which helped in reading but were not pronounced.

== Cuneiform ==
In cuneiform texts of Sumerian, Akkadian and Hittite languages, many nouns are preceded or followed by a Sumerian word acting as a determinative; this specifies that the associated word belongs to a particular semantic group. These determinatives were not pronounced. In transliterations of Sumerian, the determinatives are written in superscript in upper case. Whether a given sign is a mere determinative (not pronounced) or a Sumerogram (a logographic spelling of a word intended to be pronounced) cannot always be determined unambiguously since their use is not always consistent.

Examples of determinatives (with transliteration superscripts in parentheses):

- 𒁹 (^{1} or ^{m}) for male personal names
- 𒊩 (^{f}) for female personal name
- 𒄑 (^{GIŠ}) for trees and all things made of wood
- 𒆳 (^{KUR}) for countries
- 𒌷 (^{URU}) for cities (but also often succeeding KI)
- 𒇽 (^{LÚ}) for people and professions
- 𒇽𒈨𒌍 (^{LÚ.MEŠ}) for ethnicities or multiple people
- 𒀭 (^{DINGIR} or ^{d}) for gods and other divinities
- 𒂍 (^{É}) for buildings and temples
- 𒀯 (^{MUL}) for stars and constellations
- 𒀀𒇉 (^{ÍD}) (a ligature of A (watercourse) and ENGUR (deep waters), transliterated: A.ENGUR) before canals or rivers in administrative texts
- 𒄷 (^{MUŠEN}) for birds.

== Egyptian ==
In Ancient Egyptian hieroglyphs, determinatives came at the end of a word. Nearly every word – nouns, verbs, and adjectives – features a determinative, some of which become very specific: "Upper Egyptian barley" or "excreted things". It is believed that they were used as much as word dividers as for semantic disambiguation. Examples include 𓀀 (man), 𓁐 (woman) and 𓀭 (god/king).

Determinatives are generally not transcribed, but when they are, they are transcribed by their number in Gardiner's Sign List.

== Chinese ==
Some 90% of Chinese characters are determinative-phonetic compounds; the phonetic element and the determinative (called a radical) are combined to form a single glyph. Both the meaning and pronunciation of the characters have shifted over the millennia, to the point that the determinatives and phonetic elements are not always reliable guides; nevertheless, radicals are still important for indexing of characters such as in a dictionary.
