= Djsr (arm with powerstick) =

Egyptian hieroglyph

D44 D45
Arm with powerstick
in hieroglyphs

D40
Arm with powerstick
(simplified, or throwstick)
in hieroglyphs

The ancient Egyptian horizontally-outstretched Arm with powerstick is a hieroglyph with the meaning of "force", or "power of action". As a baton, or macehead. Power is obvious, but the origins may have also had references to magic, or the idea of driving-off evil spirits or omens.

A "sacred", or protected area is therefore created, by the action implied and used by the "Arm with Power stick". A term used in later Ancient Egypt was 'ta djeser', the 'land-sacred'. Thus temples, or mortuaries, or areas for ritual could be created.

== Language usage of "Arm with powerstick" ==
The basic language equivalent of Arm with powerstick hieroglyph is 'djeser', or 'tjeser', meaning "holy", or "sacred". The hieroglyph is also used as a determinative to emphasize a word, for example line 6 of the Rosetta Stone, uses one of the commonest words with the Arm-throwstick: 'nekht' , (i.e. "to be strong", "powerful"). In Ptolemy V's Rosetta Stone, line 6: ..."Ptolemy, the Avenger of Baq-t-(Egypt), the interpretation whereof is "Ptolemy, the strong–one-(with determinative) of Kem-t-(Egypt)" ...

Pharaoh Nectanebo II had variations of his name with the same word 'nekht', for "strength", and the Arm with Power stick determinative. The Greek goddess Nike used the same word for the meaning of herself: 'strength', and 'victory'.

== Rosetta Stone usage as 'sacred' ==
The Rosetta Stone lists 22 reasons for honoring the Pharaoh, Ptolemy V, then relates 10 items for honoring pharaoh, the last erecting his 3-script decree. In the list of the reasons for honoring pharaoh, he gave monies to honor the "sacred animals" of Ancient Egypt in their rituals; thus, pharaoh: "He gave thing every[which]-(Everything!) they needed for the embalmment of their bodies abundantly, lavishly-(djesertu)."-(line 3)

The second usage is the setup before the Rosetta Stone announces the 3-script Decree to be inscribed, and displayed. It states, for cognizance, (gnostic-to know):

...the dwellers in Egypt, glorifying-(djeser), the God appearing-(Ptolemy V - epiphanous), the lord of benefits-(Greek: eucharistos), even as is most right and proper. Shall be engraved decree this upon a tablet...

== See also ==
- Gardiner's Sign List#D. Parts of the Human Body
- List of Egyptian hieroglyphs
