= Bull (ka hieroglyph) =

Egyptian hieroglyph

E1
Bull
kꜣ
in hieroglyphs

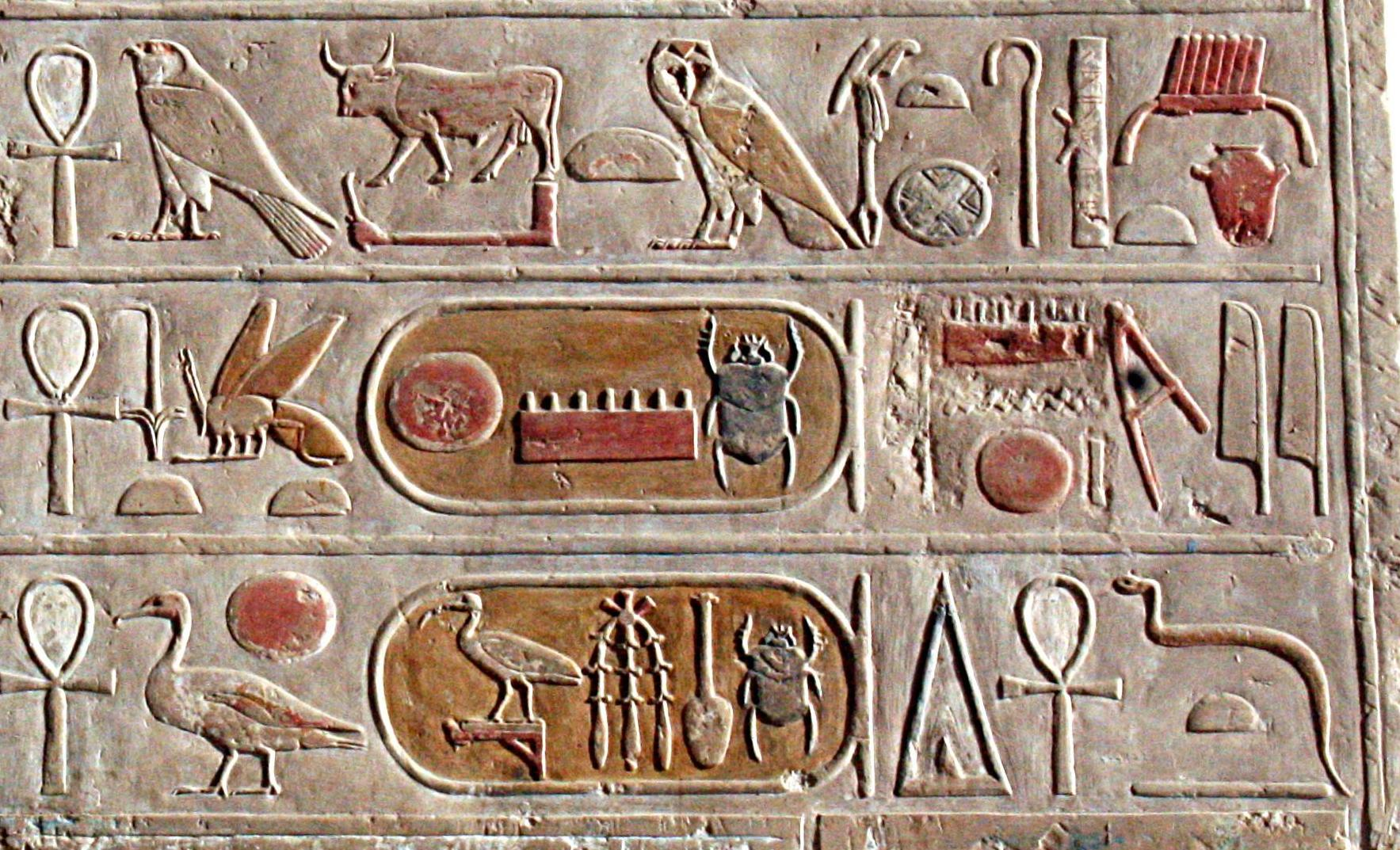
Painted Thutmosis III cartouches (temple relief), Deir el-Bahari.

The ancient Egyptian Bull (hieroglyph), Gardiner sign listed no. E1, is the representation of the common bull. The bull motif is dominant in protodynastic times (see Bull Palette), and also has prominence in the early dynastic Egypt, famously on the Narmer Palette. Its phonetic value is kꜣ (Egyptological pronunciation "ka").

bull hieroglyph is sometimes reinforced with a complementary hieroglyph, the "arm with stick of authority" (D40), E1 D40 (see photo, Deir el-Bahari).

== See also ==
- Gardiner's Sign List § E. Mammals
- List of Egyptian hieroglyphs § E1
- Ka (Egyptian soul)
