= Legs-forward (hieroglyph) =

Egyptian hieroglyph

D55
Walking
Legs-(forward)
in hieroglyphs

The Walking Legs-forward is an ancient Egyptian language hieroglyph of the concept of action, part of "going and returning". Walking Legs-returning is the other half.

The phonetic value of the hieroglyph is iw, and it means "to come". It is also used as a determinative in word formation.

== Language usage of Walking Legs-forward ==
In passages written by the pharaoh, or in stories, coming and going is common. Examples are travels to foreign lands, or visitors from other lands. Another example is the coming-and-going to ceremonial religious sites, or festivals. Another example might be discussions about the need for workers to travel to the quarries or mines.

== Rosetta Stone usage ==
Though not appearing in the Rosetta Stone, (or the lost beginning half used from the Nubayrah Stele), the twin concept with the "Walking Legs-returning" shows how either can be interchanged. And besides Ptolemy V whose name uses the returning walking feet as Ptolemy, illustrious-("pr (hieroglyph)-r-feet"=Epiphany), eucharistos, one good example is shown from line 18, (Nubayrah Stele):

He (pharaoh) took care to behold to make 'to go'-(with "returning feet"), infantry, cavalry, and ships, to drive back (or, against), those who came-("returning feet"-correct usage) to fight against Egypt...

== The word 'depart' ==
V4 G1 D54
"to depart"
"go away"
in hieroglyphs

The going in-and-coming out ideas are complex and interchangeable, as can be shown by the word "depart": it uses the Walking Legs-returning hieroglyph.

== See also ==
- Gardiner's Sign List#D. Parts of the Human Body
- List of Egyptian hieroglyphs
