= Child (hieroglyph) =

Egyptian hieroglyph

A17
Child
in hieroglyphs

A18
Child
(as Pharaoh)
in hieroglyphs

The ancient Egyptian child hieroglyph is part of the Egyptian Gardiner's Sign List hieroglyphs for the beginning core subgroup of Man and his Occupations. It relates to the child, and childhood, and has a version for the Pharaoh, as a child.

The hieroglyphic equivalent of the child hieroglyph is nn as a phonogram. It is the ancient Egyptian language equivalent of hrd-(meaning "child"). The hieroglyph is also a determinative in words relating to childhood; (also an abbreviation for "child").

== See also ==
- Gardiner's Sign List#A. Man and his Occupations
- List of Egyptian hieroglyphs
- Harpocrates
