= Grape arbor (hieroglyph) =

Egyptian hieroglyph

M43
Grape Arbor
in hieroglyphs

The ancient Egyptian Grape arbor hieroglyph is Gardiner sign listed no. M43 in Gardiner's subcategory for trees and plants. The hieroglyph shows a horizontal vine with stylized bunches suspended below; each end is supported by the hieroglyph for a "prop", Gardiner no. O30,

O30

The Grape arbor hieroglyph is used in Egyptian hieroglyphs as a determinative, or ideogram for words related to the 'vineyard', i3rrt, or for 'wine', irp; it is also used for describing 'fruit' or 'orchards'.

The hieroglyph is used twice in the Rosetta Stone to refer to the vineyards, at the beginning of the decree listings, and at: remitting "of the grain bushels 5 which were taken on the arura in the field of the gods, and likewise the measure of their wine [which was taken on the arura] in the vineyard." (lines N14-(Nubayrah Stele) and Rosetta, R2)

== See also ==
- Gardiner's Sign List#M. Trees and Plants
- List of Egyptian hieroglyphs
