= Chariots of Tutankhamun =

Ancient Egyptian Chariot

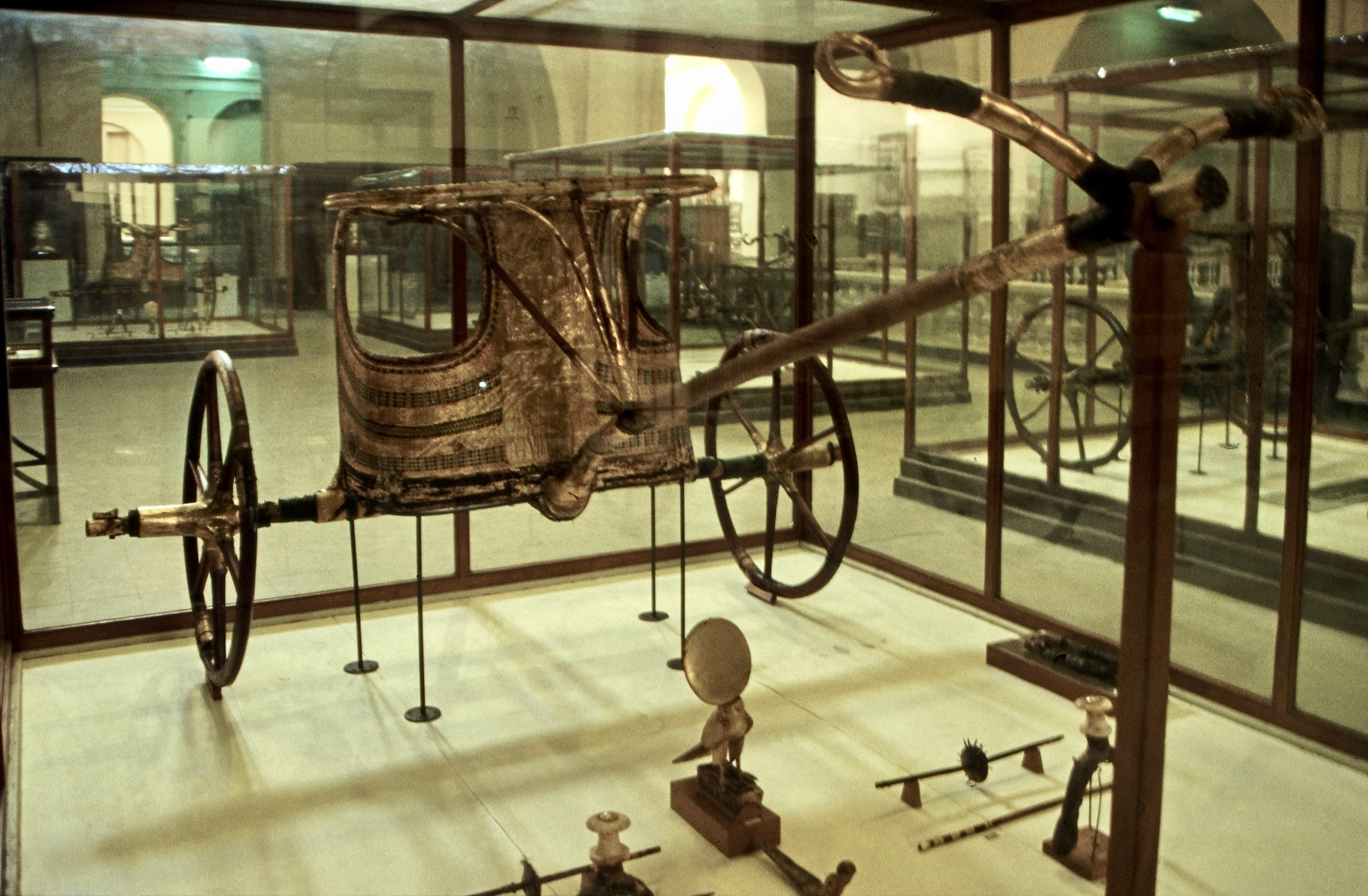
One of the chariots, Egyptian Museum

The chariots of Tutankhamun comprise a set of six ancient Egyptian chariots found during the discovery of the tomb of Tutankhamun in 1922 by British archaeologist Howard Carter alongside many other artefacts. The set consists of two large ceremonial chariots, a smaller highly decorated one and three light ones for daily use by Tutankhamun. They were designed for hunting, war and parades, with some featuring ingenious design for high speeds.

The chariots have been displayed in separate museums, such as the Egyptian Museum in Cairo, until 2018, when they were moved to the Grand Egyptian Museum alongside other ancient artefacts.

== Description ==
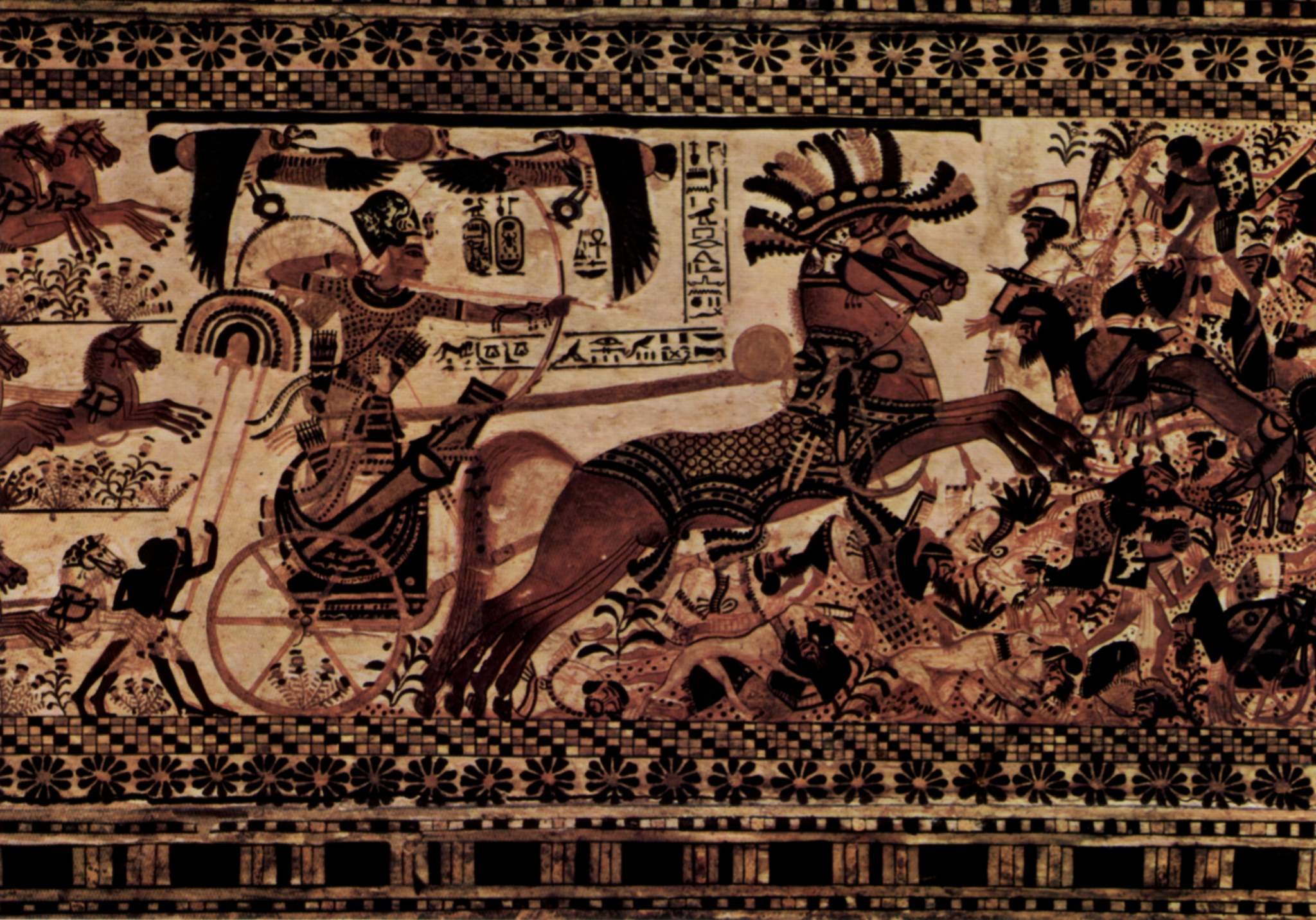
Tutankhamun's chariot in combat on a contemporary painting, c. 1327 BC

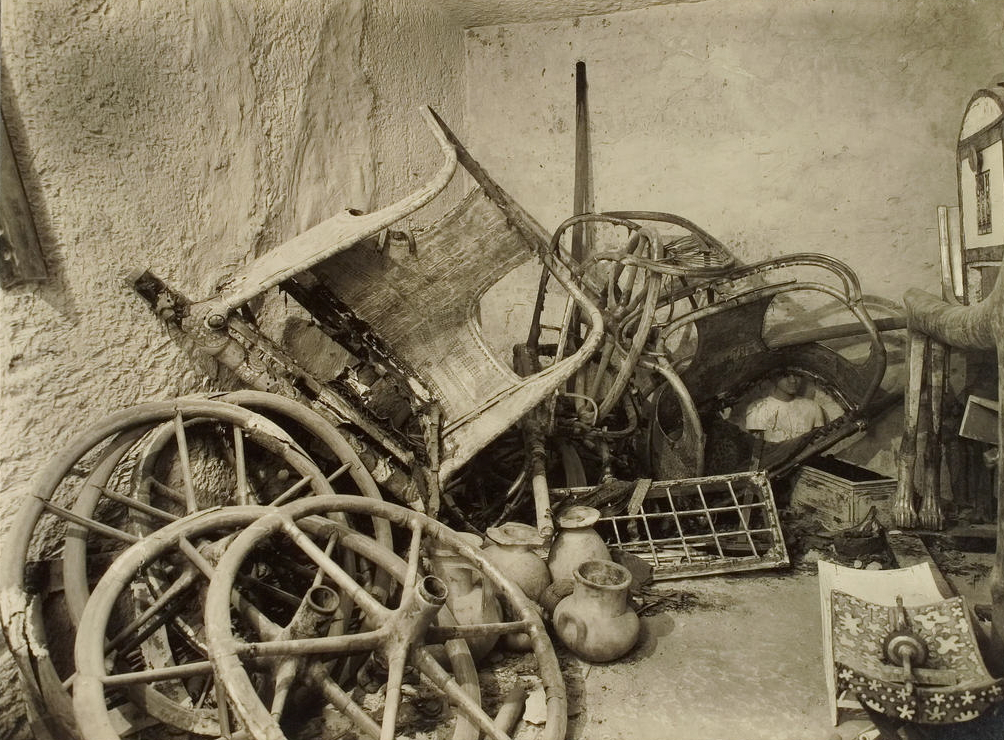
Chariots as found in Tutankhamun's tomb, 1922

Four chariots were found in the Tutankhamun tomb's antechamber and two in the store room. All six chariots were initially found dismantled. Howard Carter referred to two of the most elaborately decorated chariots as "state chariots".

One of them (GEM 4940, Carter no. 122) was studied and found to be made with a bentwood body, 1.02 m wide and 0.44 m deep, partially filled with a thin wooden sheet. The frame is strengthened at the front with an additional top-rail and the space between it and the body is decorated with a hieroglyphic union symbol, with six foreign captives (one is now missing) on its right side. The exterior of the chariot body is decorated with glass-inlaid bands of feather patterns alternating with bands combining running spirals and rosettes. The central inner and outer panels feature a raised relief with a solar falcon, identified in the inscription as Horus of Behedet, from which descend crowned uraei. Below are Tutankhamun's prenomen and nomen, as well as the name of his consort, Queen Ankhesenamun. The lower part of the panels show two Rekhyt birds, representing the people of Egypt, that adore a djed pillar flanked by ankh signs while, below, foreign captives are shown entangled. This design was interpreted as the royal couple adored by the Egyptian people, ensuring the life and stability of the king and queen under the sun god hovering above and protecting them.

== Studies ==
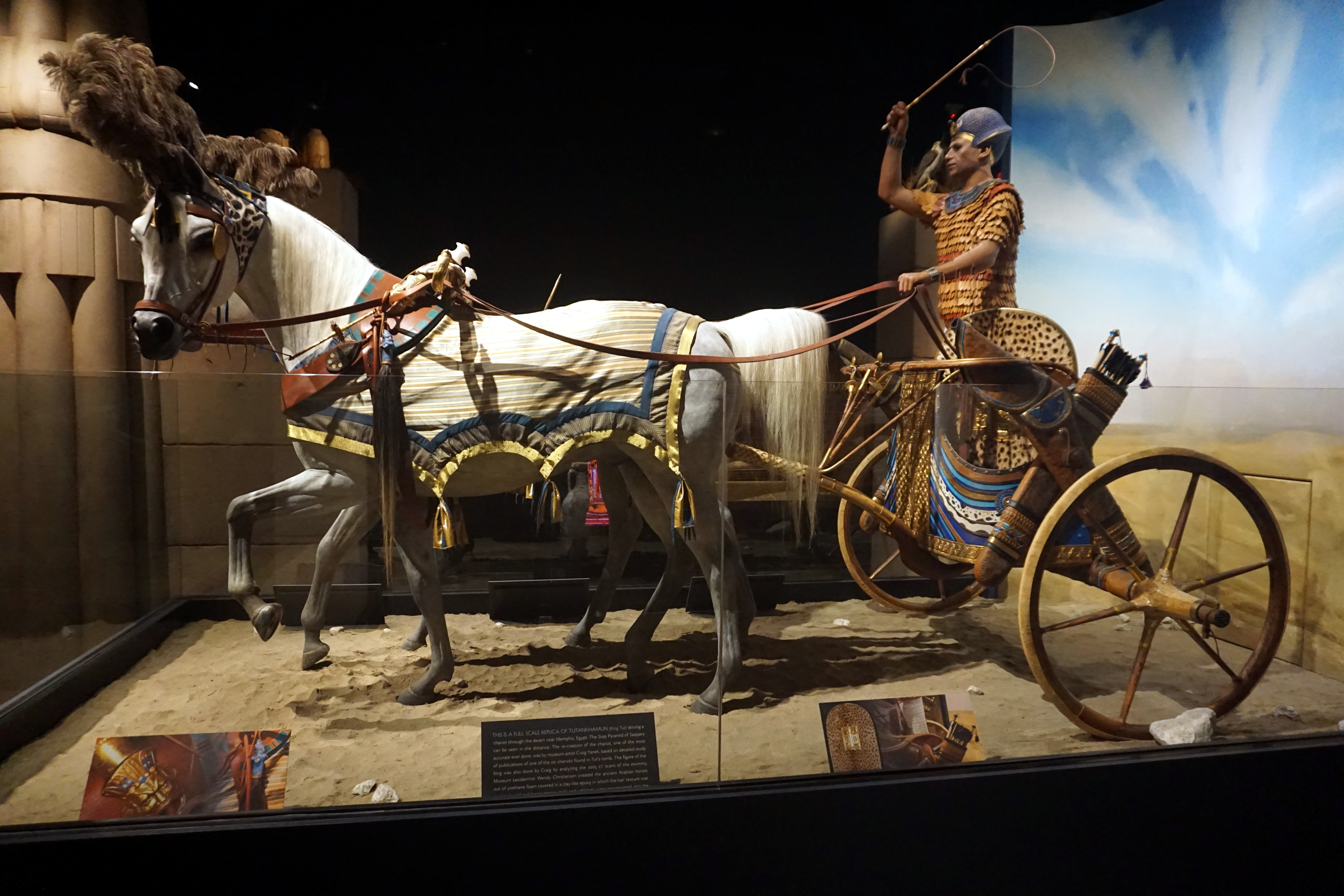
Reconstruction of full chariot setup in the Milwaukee Public Museum, 2022

A study of Tutankhamun's chariots from 2000 found that the structure of the wheels, the spokes, the materials chosen for the sleeve bearings, the use of animal fat for lubrication and the design as a whole are remarkable, being comparable to European carts of the 19th century AD. The six-spoke wheels feature flexible wood rims, acting as tires, which adapted to soil irregularities. Those rims absorbed uniformly the loads transmitted by soil irregularities, so that the vibrations were damped by the wheels themselves, similar to modern car suspension. The chariots could reach speeds of 25 miles per hour (40 km/h). According to Bela Sandor, professor emeritus of engineering physics at University of Wisconsin–Madison, while there is no evidence of chariot racing from that era, Tutankhamun's chariots have many technical features that imply a racing origin.

== Chariots in tomb KV62 ==
=== General description ===
Carter's notes contain the following description:

Six chariots were found in Tutankhamun's tomb (KV62), including two government chariots, two heavy open chariots, an open heavy chariot from the "treasury of the tomb", and one light smaller. Two of these were highly decorated and do not appear to have been used before being placed in the tomb. The set of two "state chariots", as Howard Carter called them, are enclosed by a thin wooden paneling completely covered with a primer and gold, and further decorated with inlays of glass and ivory. The wheels of the two broken chariots in the treasury were partially covered with leather (already worn) that had originally been decorated with gold overlay. The two simpler chariots in the antechamber had open frames that were not covered with wood or leather. In addition to the above, numerous separate parts of chariots were found, the construction of a wooden wheel made of two wooden struts bent into a "V" shape, glued together after rounding and covered with green leather deserves attention. In better preserved pieces, the joint can only be distinguished under optical magnification. The circumference of the wheel in the rim is surrounded by a leather strap covering the tongue wedges of the joints with the wheel. Some, unused before being placed in the tomb they are covered with paint and gold.

All this shows that this is an exceptionally skilled craftsmanship, long-established procedures and fine-tuned by experience of one's own driving ability in uneven terrain. The cart had no seat, the driver stood upright on the flexible floor and in relation to the entire structure at the centre of gravity, which ensured maximum stability when driving over uneven terrain. The horse was controlled by the reins. The overall design, choice and workmanship provided for efficient use when driving over uneven terrain, and reliable coordination between the driver and draft animals. The historical legacy is reflected to the present day, an example is the racing sulky. (Note: Concept & Direction: Jaromír Málek)

=== Drivability ===
Carter's notes contain the following description:

The Egyptian chariots were small, usually only large enough to contain two persons standing upright. They were very light, and could be driven at a great speed. The under-carriage, about 1.75 mm wide from wheel to wheel, and therefore suitable for narrow tracks, desert, or mountainous roads. They were used in war, hunting, and processional purposes. In battle, the Egyptians fought from their chariots - the chariot corps constituted a very large and effective portion of the ancient Egyptian army. The chariot was open at the back, so that the occupants might readily leap to the ground and up again as might be necessary. In driving, a short whip was used. Although a car was made to contain two persons, the king is invariably represented alone in his chariot, with the reins fastened round his body, when engaged in bending his bow or casting his spear.

These vehicles were sometimes splendidly ornamented with gold, and inlaid with semi-precious stones, faience, and coloured glass. Three specimens found in this tomb, judging from their rich adornment, seem to have been appendages of Egyptian pomp and magnificence; the other three specimens, although equally well constructed, were not so sumptuous in character, and were probably intended for general purposes, such as hunting or promenading.

=== Production and craftsmanship ===
Carter's notes contain the following description:

The manufacture of chariots was a combination of crafts rarely united in one trade, embracing as it did work in such divers materials as wood, bronze, gold, linen, and leather, etc. And many highly skilled artisans must necessarily have been employed in the various stages of chariot construction. These workmen would include body-makers, who built up the parts in which the charioteer stood; carriage-makers, who made and fitted together all the under parts of the vehicle, on which the body rests; wheel-wrights; smiths for the metal-work; curriers for the leather-work; trimmers for the upholstering; and lastly decorators, the gilder, inlayer, and painter - who contributed to the elegance of the car.

It would seem that the manufacture of the chariots received an immense impulse from the earlier monarchs of the Egyptian New Empire, by whom the craft was very much encouraged, for, during the Eighteenth dynasty the chariot builders became masters in their craft and shew extraordinary skilful structural adaptation.

=== Chariot canopy ===
More recent studies by Japanese and Egyptian experts under the Grand Egyptian Museum Joint Conservation Project confirmed that one of the chariots (GEM 4940, Carter no. 122) originally had a canopy attached to the chariot body, as first proposed by Edwin C. Brock in 2012 (previously the canopy had been considered as a portable sunshade). However, it is impossible to join these two artefacts together because of their fragile condition, so it was decided to display them separately. It is believed that this canopied chariot was used in royal parades and ceremonies, driven at a moderate pace. As the texts on this chariot mention both Tutankhamun and his consort Ankhesenamun, the chariot is thought to be designed for carrying the royal couple during parades. The chariot was introduced for royal parades earlier by pharaoh Akhenaten, although there is no pictorial evidence showing Tutankhamun riding on the chariot on such occasion.

== Summary ==
The Tutankhamun-class chariot is the earliest high-performance machine, most likely developed via racing and thoughtful mechanistic modelling and testing, and made with exquisite craftsmanship. The suspension system of springs and dampers comprises simple elements that are useful by chance, and also components and subassemblies for advantages in structural dynamics and ride quality. These chariots' spokes and joints have aircraft-like damage tolerance, and are more sophisticated than those of any veteran car with wooden wheels.

== Gallery ==
=== Historical analogies of some chariots ===
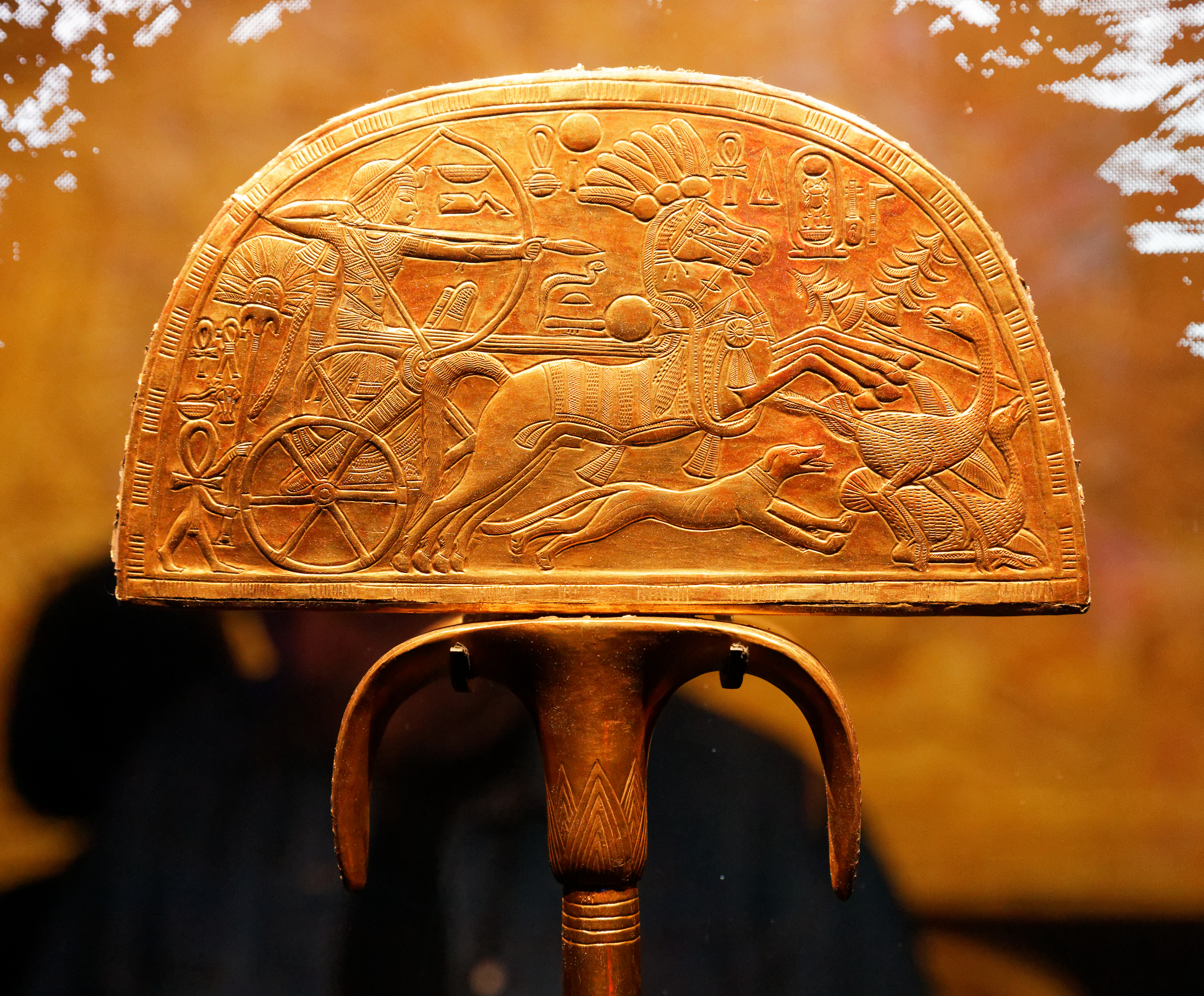
Gold-plated wooden fan called "ostrich hunting", Tuanchamon on a game hunt

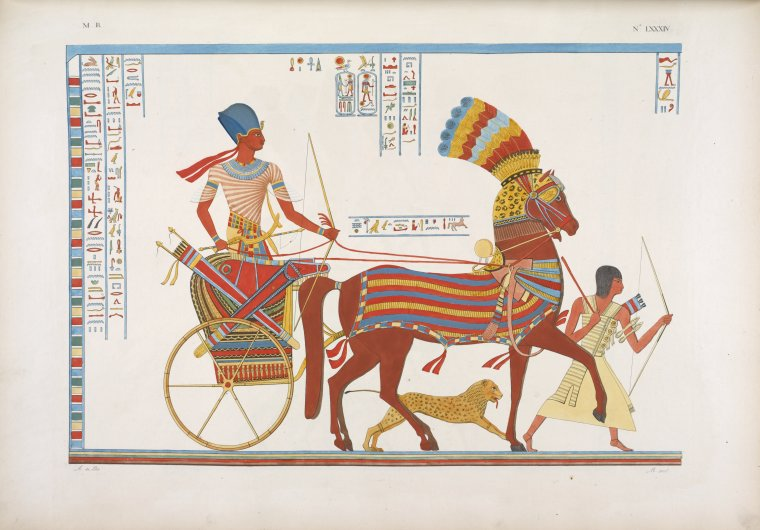
Egyptian Tutankhamun-class chariot; 19th dynasty, Ramesses II

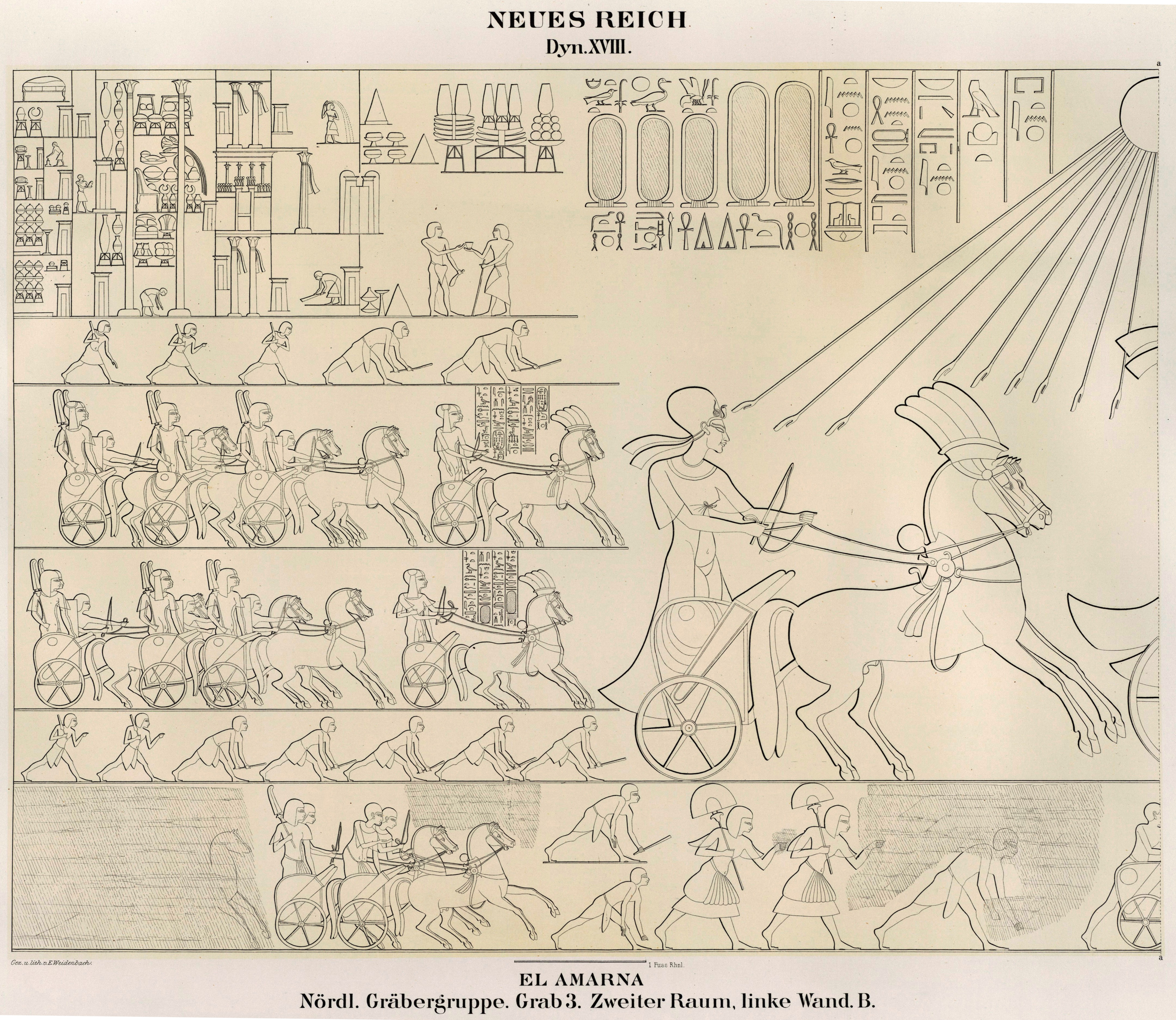
Akhenaten and Nefertiti Family Trip;
El Amarna Tomb No. 3

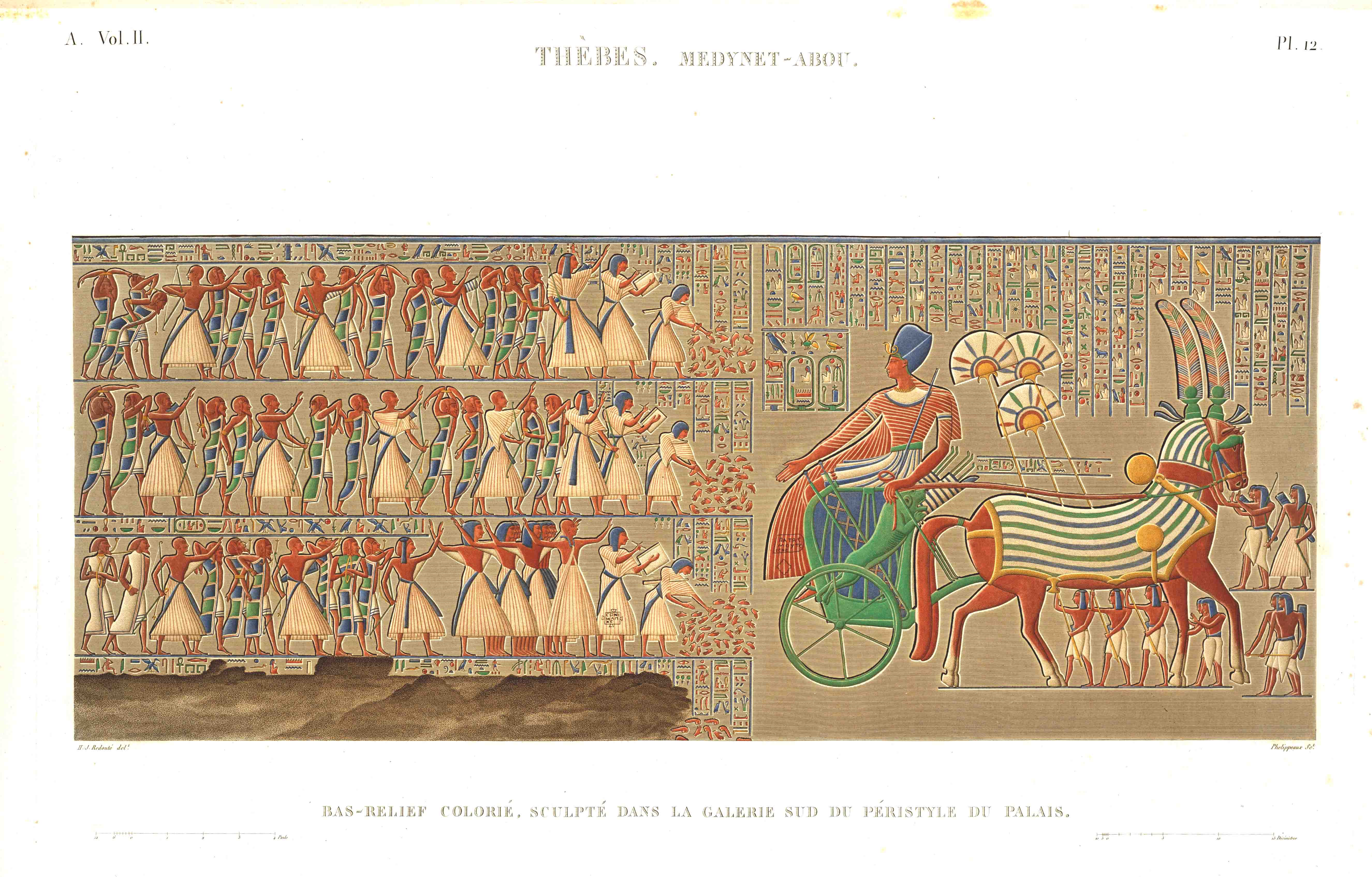
Seti I in a war chariot; Thebes Karnak

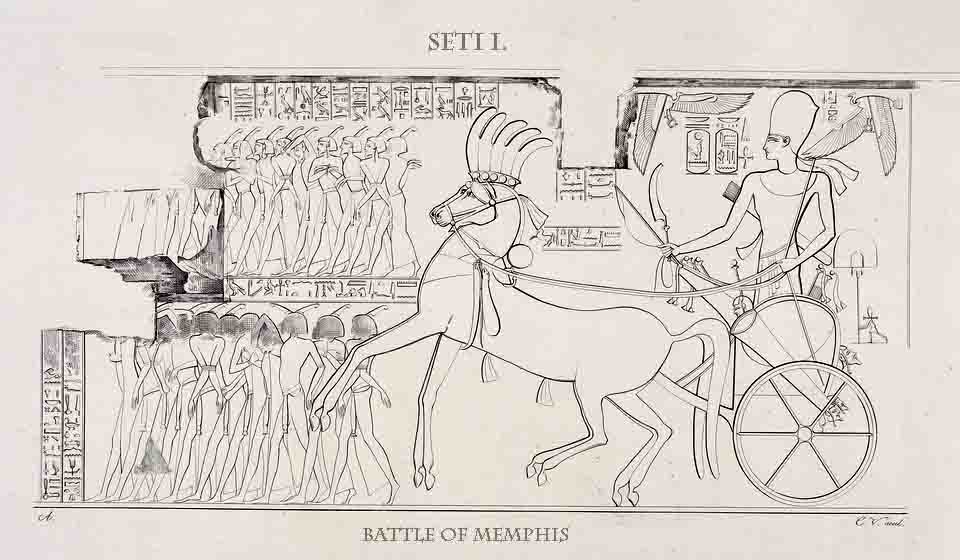
Seti I fights for his capital city Memphis

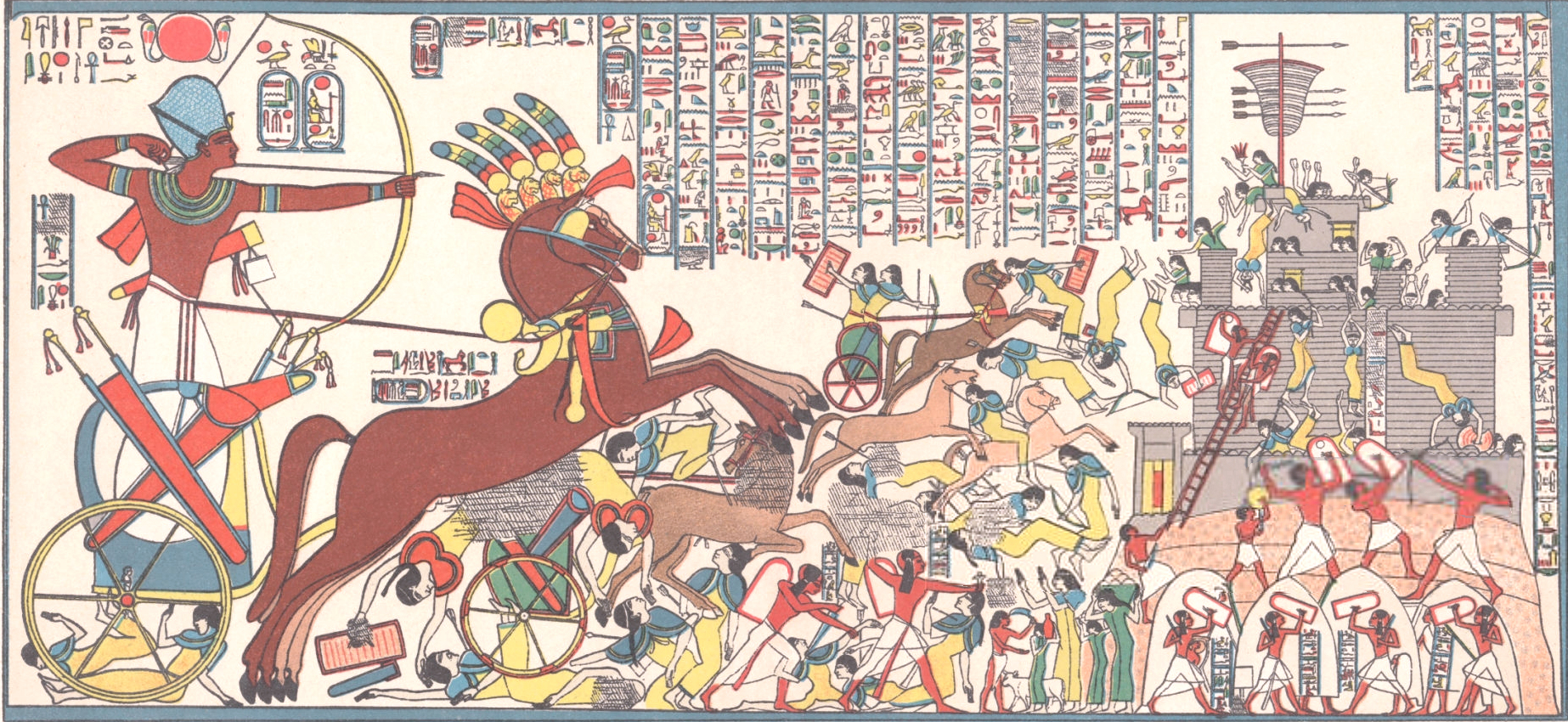
Ramesses II at the Siege of Dapur

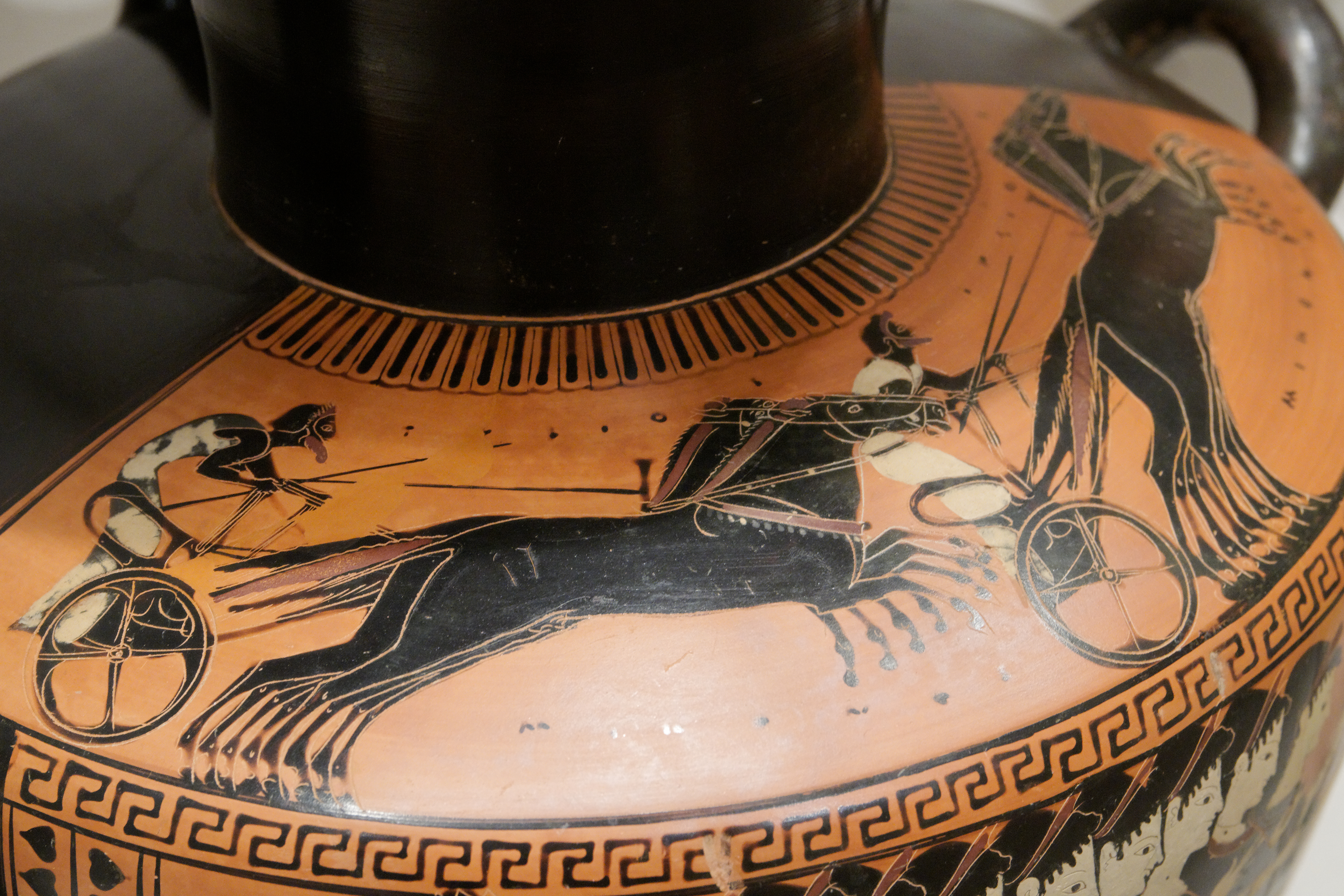
Chariot race; ancient Greek water container ~500 BC
