= Cartouche =

Oval enclosing hieroglyphs of a royal name in Ancient Egypt

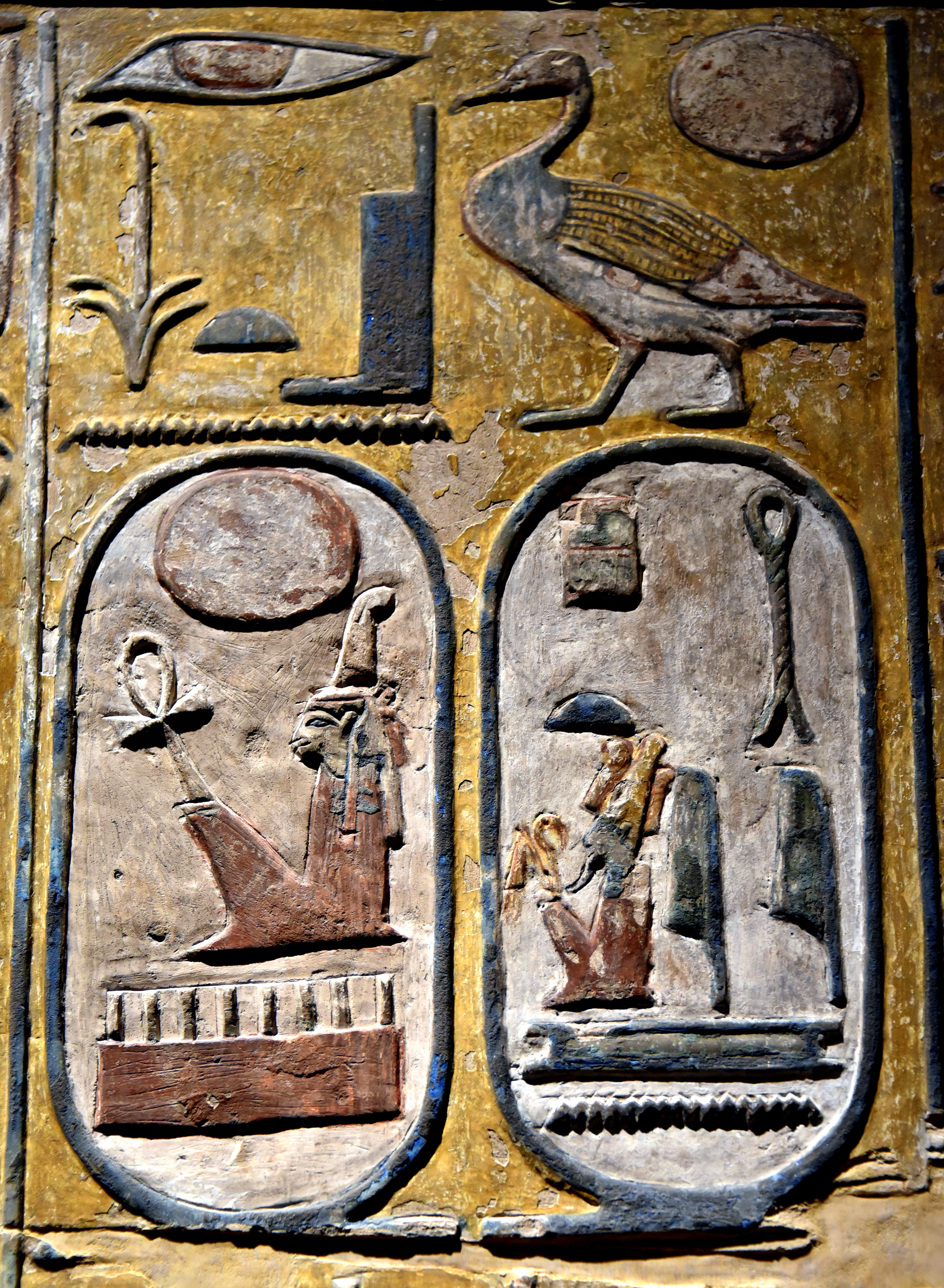
Birth and throne cartouches of Pharaoh Seti I, from KV17 at the Valley of the Kings, Egypt. Neues Museum, Berlin

In Egyptian hieroglyphs, a cartouche (/kɑːrˈtuːʃ/ kar-TOOSH from French from Italian cartuccia) is an oval with a line at one end tangent to it, indicating that the text enclosed is a royal name. The first examples of the cartouche are associated with pharaohs at the end of the Third Dynasty, but the feature did not come into common use until the beginning of the Fourth Dynasty under Pharaoh Sneferu.

V10
Cartouche
in hieroglyphs

As a hieroglyph, a cartouche can represent the Egyptian-language word for "name". It is listed as no. V10 in Gardiner's Sign List. While the cartouche is usually vertical with a horizontal line, it can be angled perpendicularly to fit a name better with a vertical line at the end (in the direction of reading). The succeeding Demotic script reduces the cartouche to a pair of brackets and a vertical line.

The term cartouche originally meant a muzzleloader's paper powder cartridge from observations by French soldiers noticing the oval symbol frequently repeated on pharaonic ruins they encountered resembling it. The ancient Egyptian word for this oval symbol was shenu (compare with Coptic ϣⲛⲉ šne homonym yielding eventual sound changes), and the cartouche was essentially an expanded shen ring.

== Findings ==
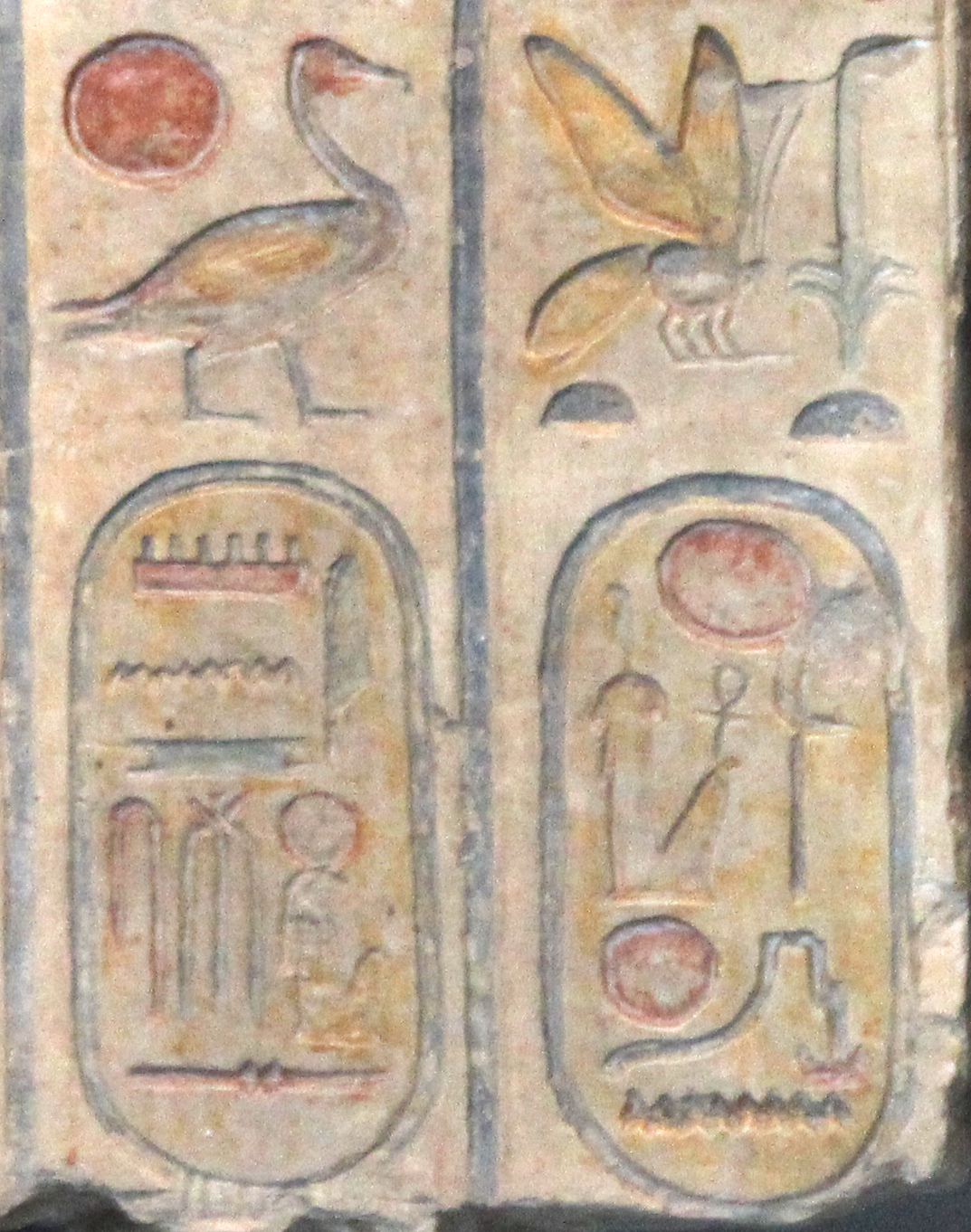
Birth and throne cartouches of Pharaoh Rameses II, from the Fragmentary Abydos King List at the temple of Ramesses II at Abydos, currently located in Egypt. British Museum, London

Of the five royal titularies it was the prenomen (the throne name), and the "Son of Ra" titulary (the so-called nomen name given at birth), which were enclosed by a cartouche.

At times amulets took the form of a cartouche displaying the name of a king and placed in tombs. Archaeologists often find such items important for dating a tomb and its contents. Cartouches were formerly only worn by pharaohs. The oval surrounding their name was meant to protect them from evil spirits in life and after death. The cartouche has become a symbol representing good luck and protection from evil.

The cartouche in half-section, Gardiner no. V11 (as seen below) has a separate meaning in the Egyptian language as a determinative for actions and nouns dealing with items: "to divide", "to exclude". V11
The cartouche hieroglyph is used as a determinative for Egyptian language šn-(sh)n, for "circuit", or "ring"-(like the shen ring or the cartouche). Later it was used for rn, the word "name". The word can also be spelled as "r" with "n", the mouth over the horizontal n. V10 D21 N35

== See also ==
- Serekh, a predecessor to the cartouche
- Toki Pona, a modern constructed language using cartouches to write proper names
