= Nekhbet =

Ancient Egyptian goddess

- Illustration of Nekhbet with outstretched wings wearing an Atef crown and holding both shen rings and plumed scepters, based on depictions from antiquity.
Name in hieroglyphs
n x b M22 t mwt
- Major cult center: Nekheb
- Symbol: Vulture

Nekhbet (/ˈnɛkˌbɛt/; also spelt Nekhebet) is an early predynastic local goddess in Egyptian mythology, who was the patron of the city of Nekheb (her name meaning of Nekheb). Ultimately, she became the patron of Upper Egypt and one of the two patron deities (alongside Wadjet) for all of Ancient Egypt when it was unified.

== Mythology ==
One of Egypt's earliest temples was the shrine of Nekhbet at Nekheb (also referred to as El Kab). It was the companion city to Nekhen, the religious and political capital of Upper Egypt, at the end of the Predynastic period (c. 3200–3100 BC) and probably, also during the Early Dynastic Period (c. 3100–2686 BC). The original settlement on the Nekhen site dates from Naqada I or the late Badarian cultures. At its height, from about 3400 BC, Nekhen had at least 5,000 and possibly as many as 10,000 inhabitants.

Nekhbet was the tutelary deity of Upper Egypt. Nekhbet and her Lower Egyptian counterpart Wadjet often appeared together as the "Two Ladies". One of the titles of each ruler was the Nebty name, which began with the hieroglyphs for [s/he] of the Two Ladies....

== Iconography ==
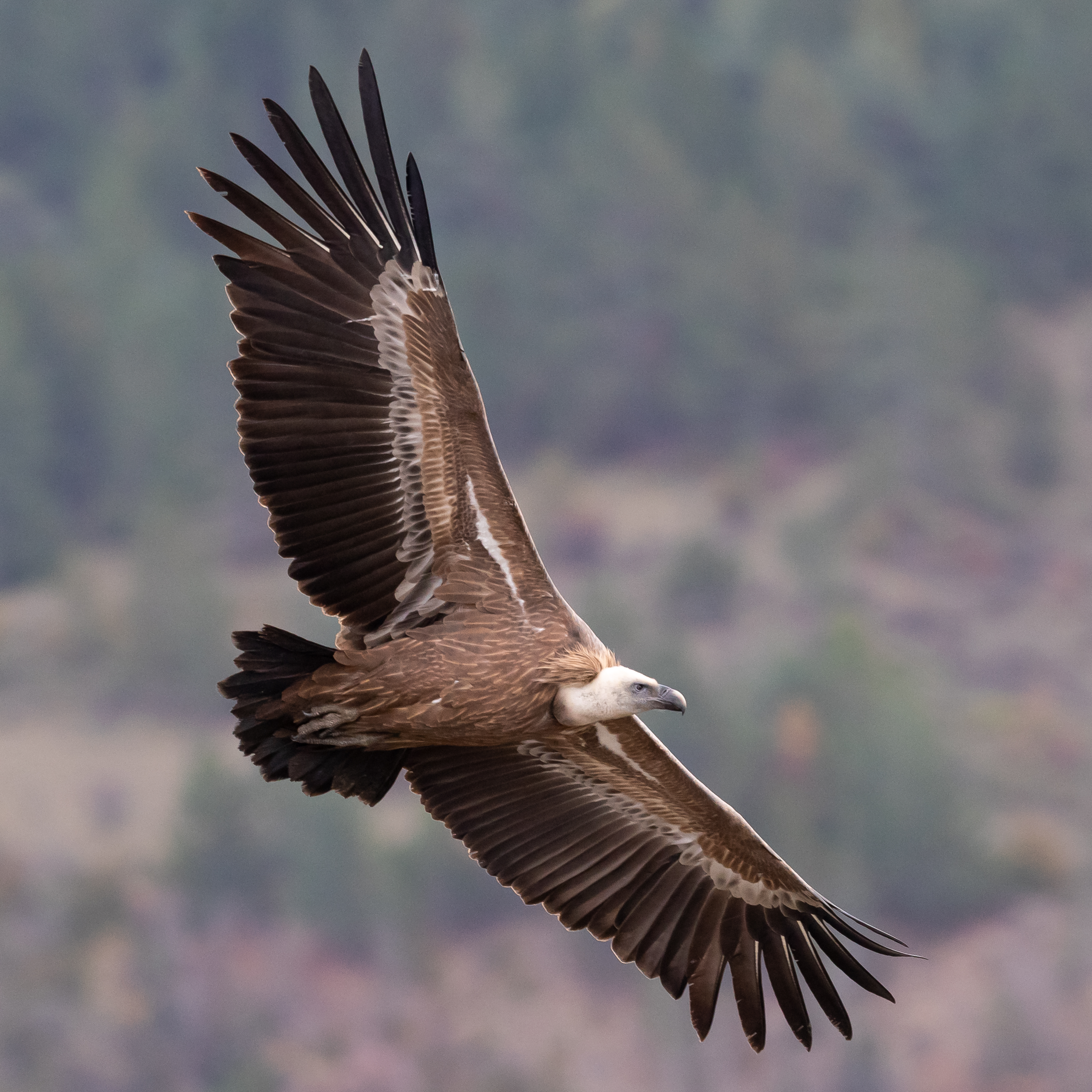
A griffon vulture flying with its out-stretched wings

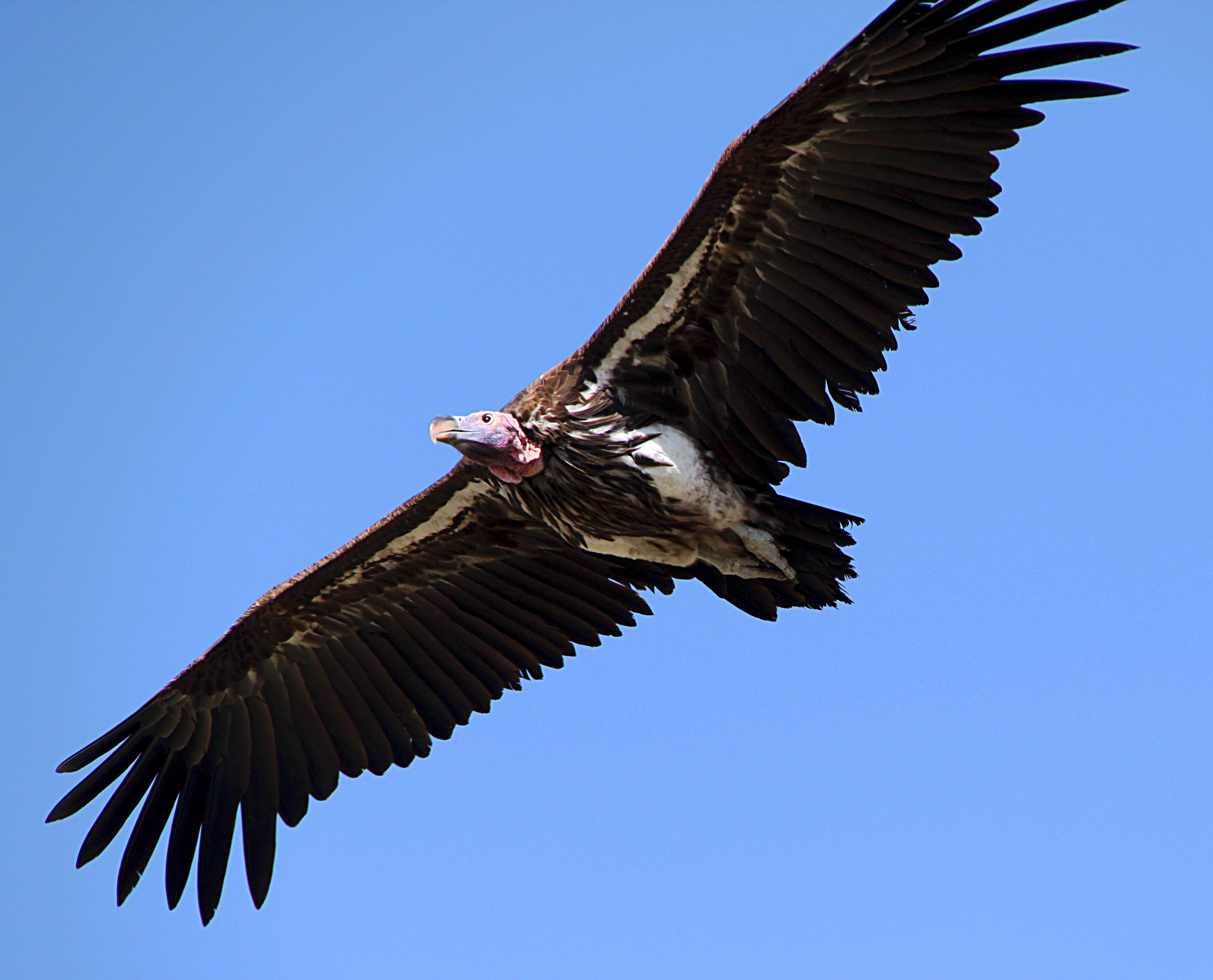
A lappet-faced vulture flying with its out-stretched wings

In art, Nekhbet was depicted as a vulture. Alan Gardiner identified the species that was used in divine iconography as a griffon vulture. Arielle P. Kozloff, however, argues that the vultures in New Kingdom art, with their blue-tipped beaks and loose skin, better resemble the lappet-faced vulture.

In New Kingdom times, the vulture appeared alongside the uraeus on the headdresses with which kings were buried. The uraeus and vulture are traditionally interpreted as Wadjet and Nekhbet, but Edna R. Russmann has suggested that in this context they represent Isis and Nephthys, two major funerary goddesses, instead.

Nekhbet usually was depicted hovering, with her wings spread above the royal image, clutching a shen symbol (representing eternal encircling protection), frequently in her claws.

Depictions of animal deities start with the animal being depicted directly. Later the animal appears in human form, but still with an animal head. Individual deities continue into historical times (post 3000 BC) to often be described in their original animal form: e.g., Horus (Falcon), Wadjet (cobra) and Nekhbet (vulture).

== Gallery ==
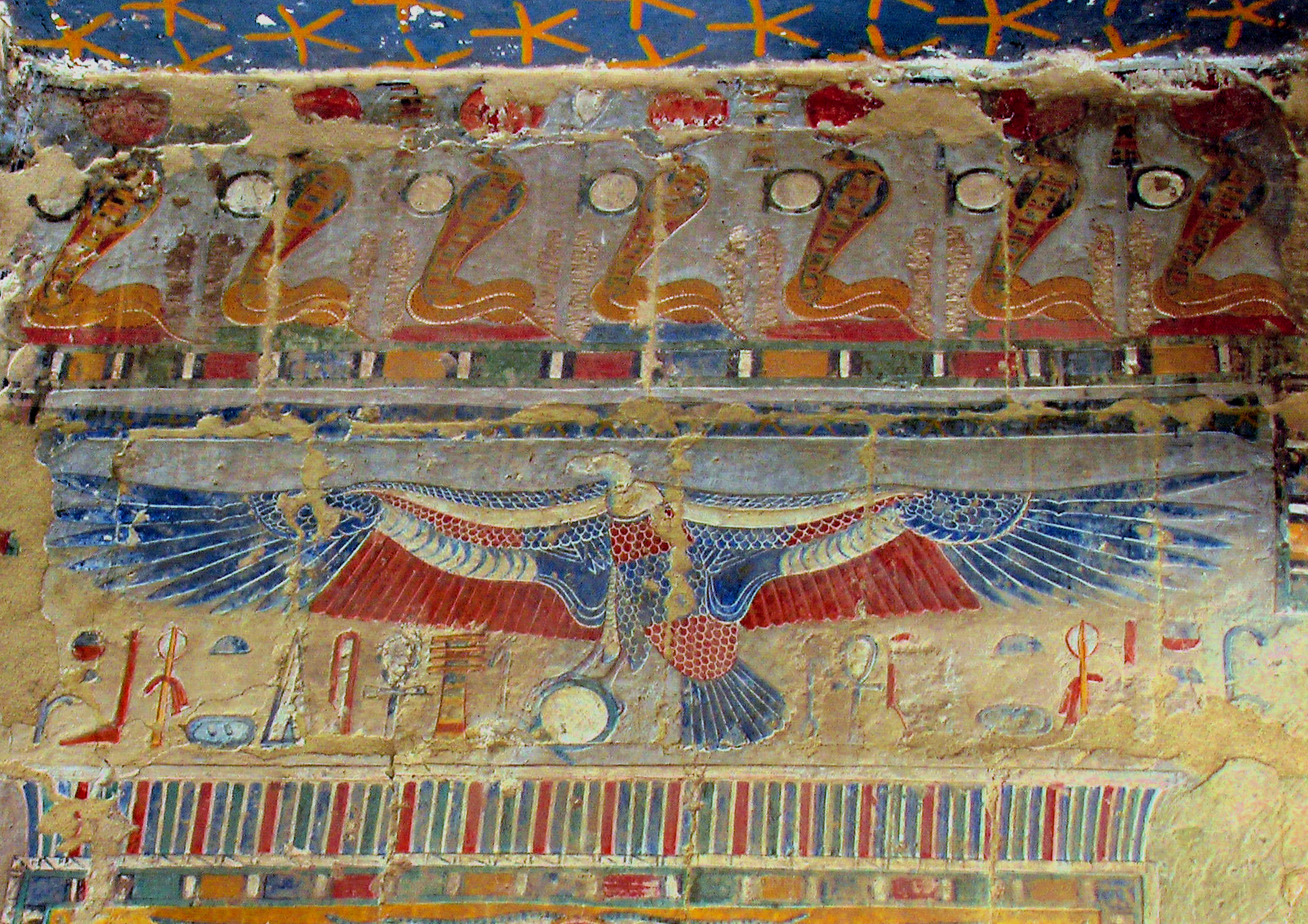
Nekhbet with outstretched wings below a row of uraei, from the mortuary temple of Hatshepsut, Deir el-Bahari

Nekhbet as a woman

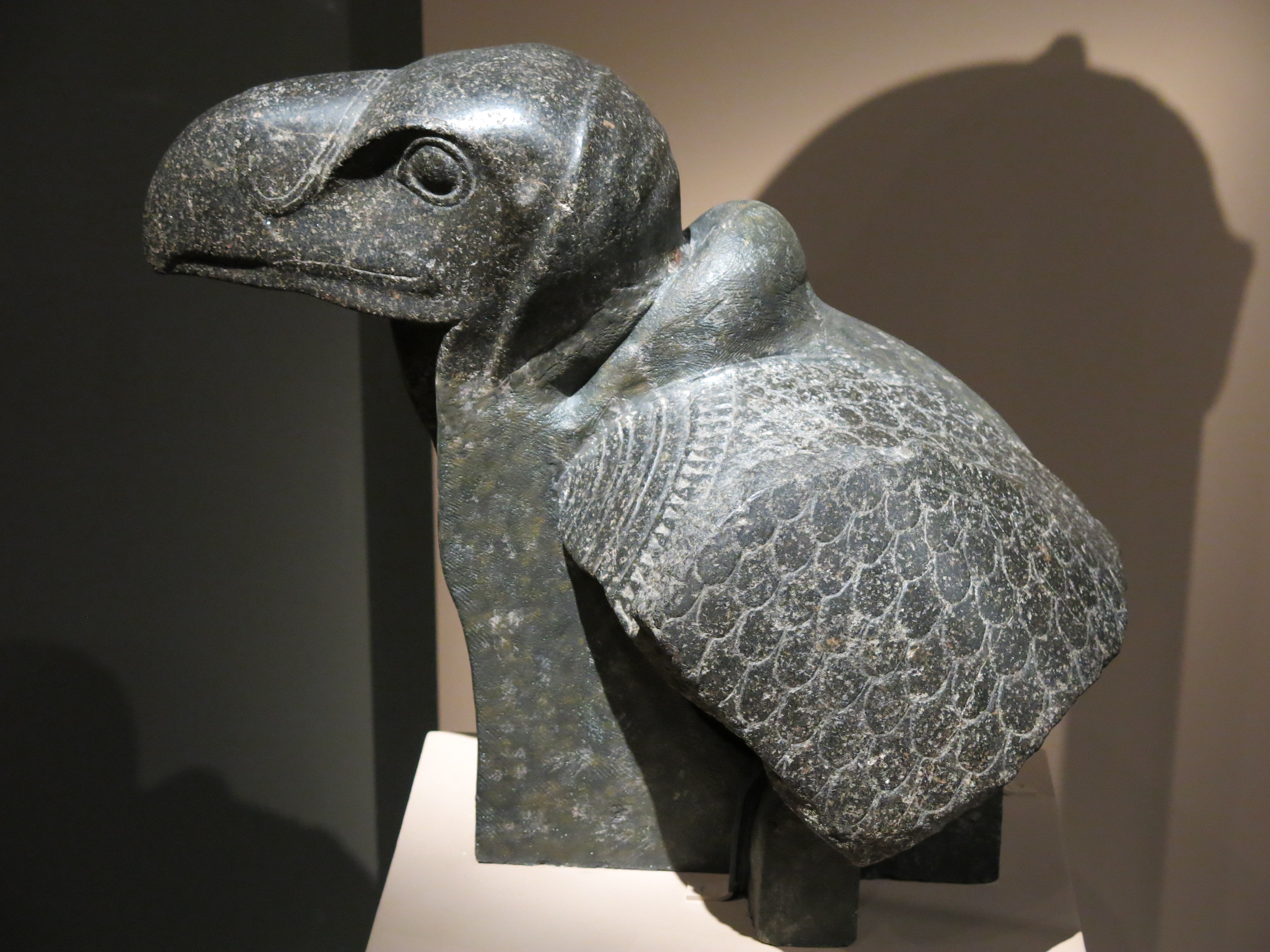
Granite statue of Nekhbet from Sanam in Lower Nubia, Twenty-fifth Dynasty, Ashmolean Museum

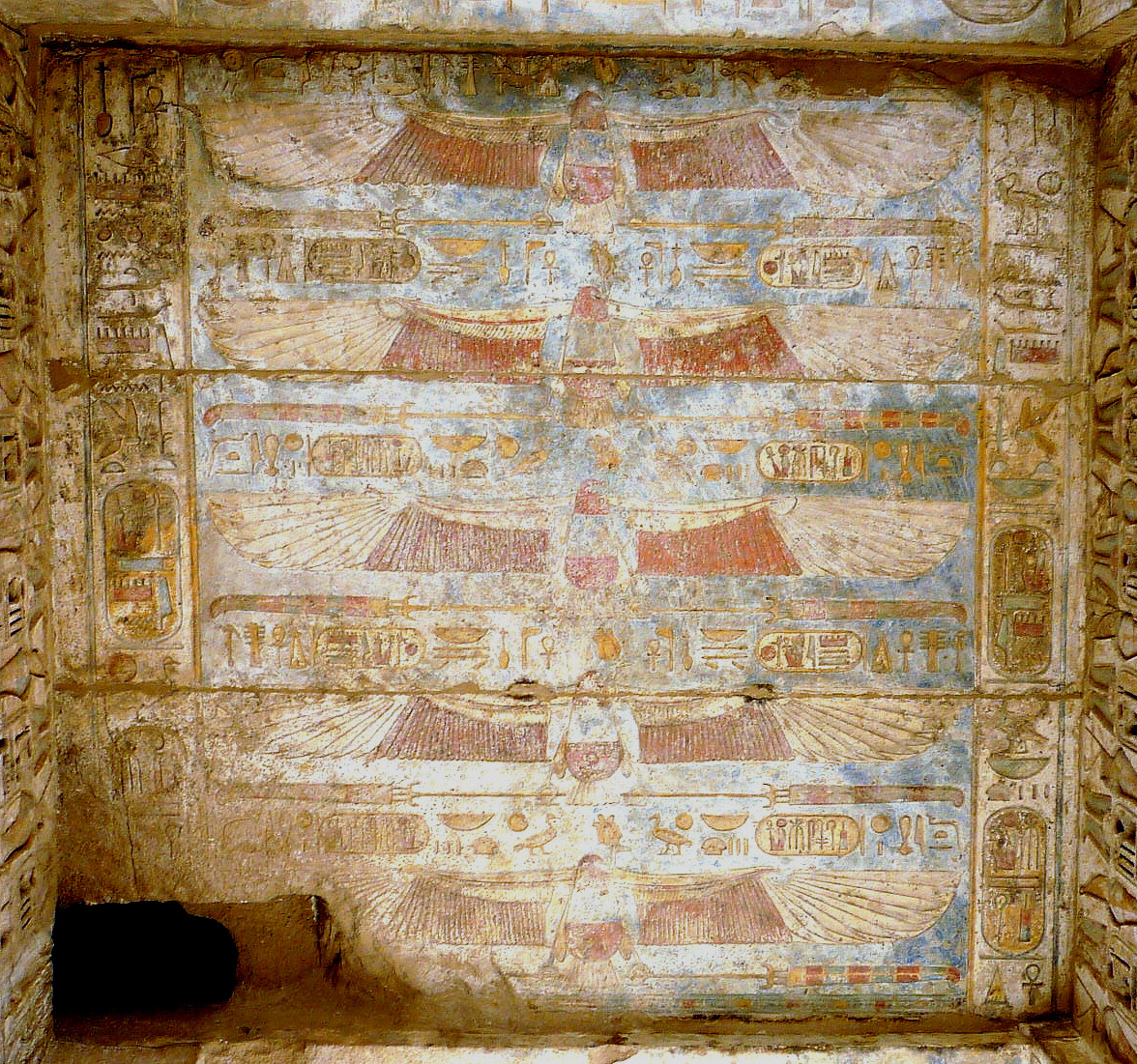
Paintings of Nekhbet on the ceiling of the mortuary temple of Ramesses III at Medinet Habu

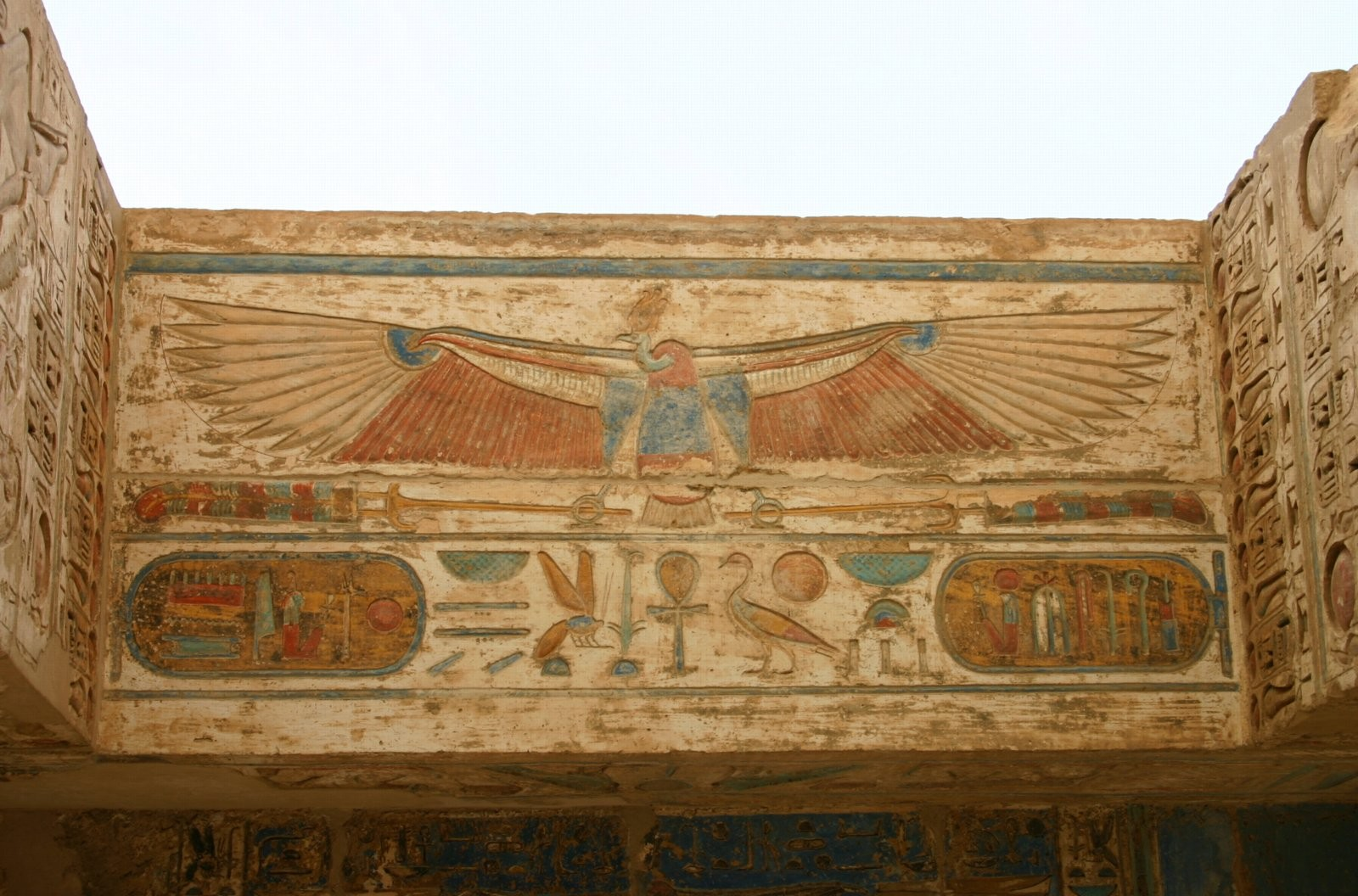
Nekhbet above the Nomen and prenomen of Ramesses III

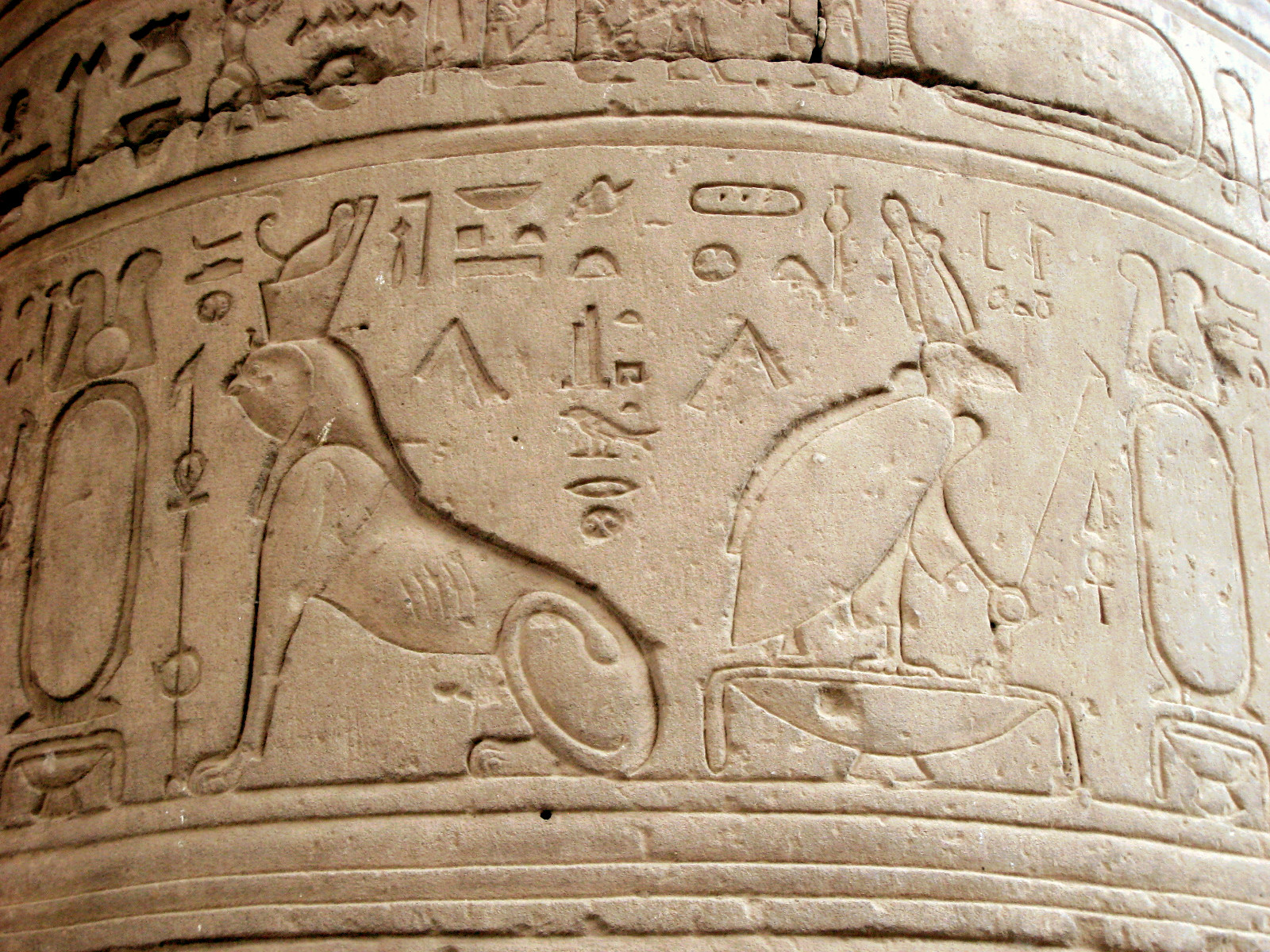
Nekhbet next to Haremakhet on a column

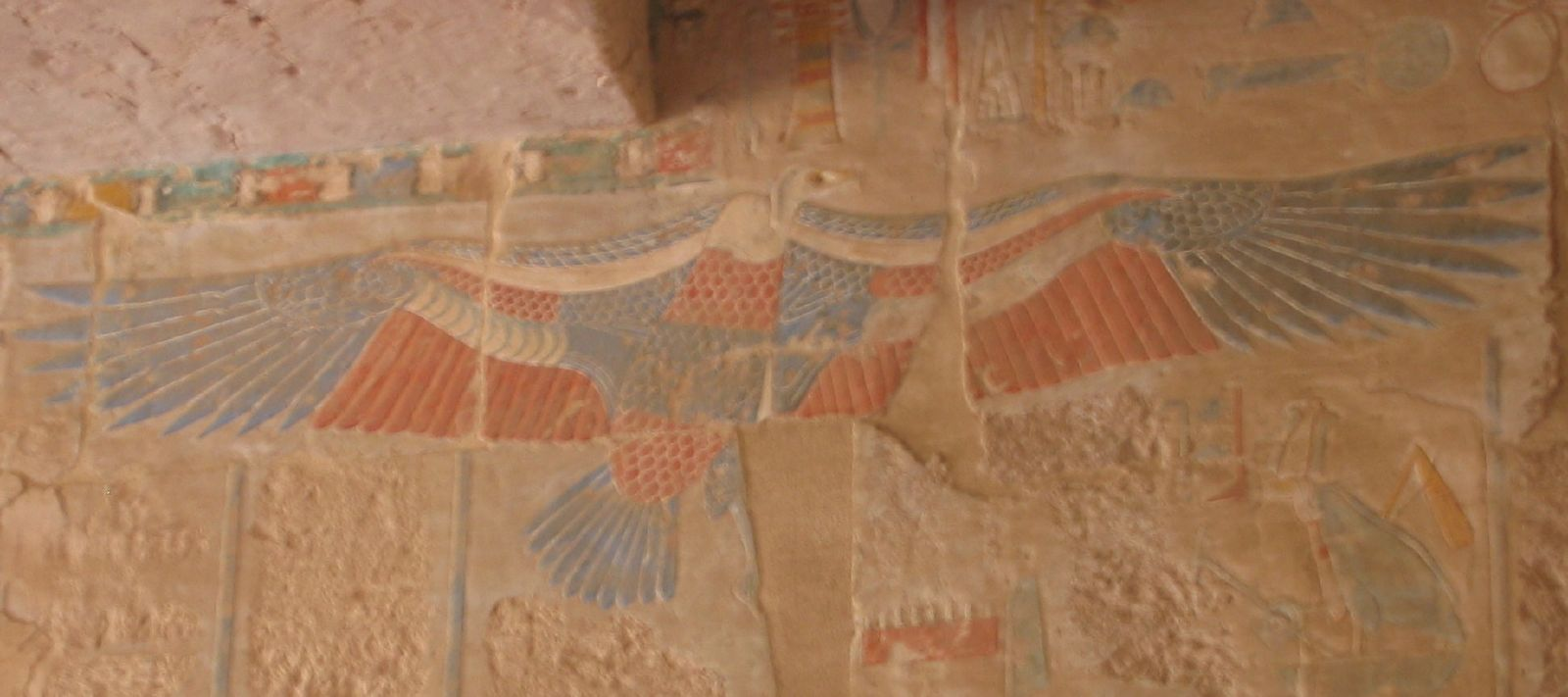
A painted relief depicting Nekhbet in the Temple of Hatshepsut

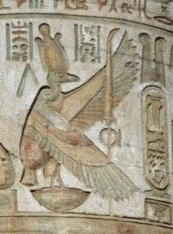
Nekhbet holding a staff and Shen ring

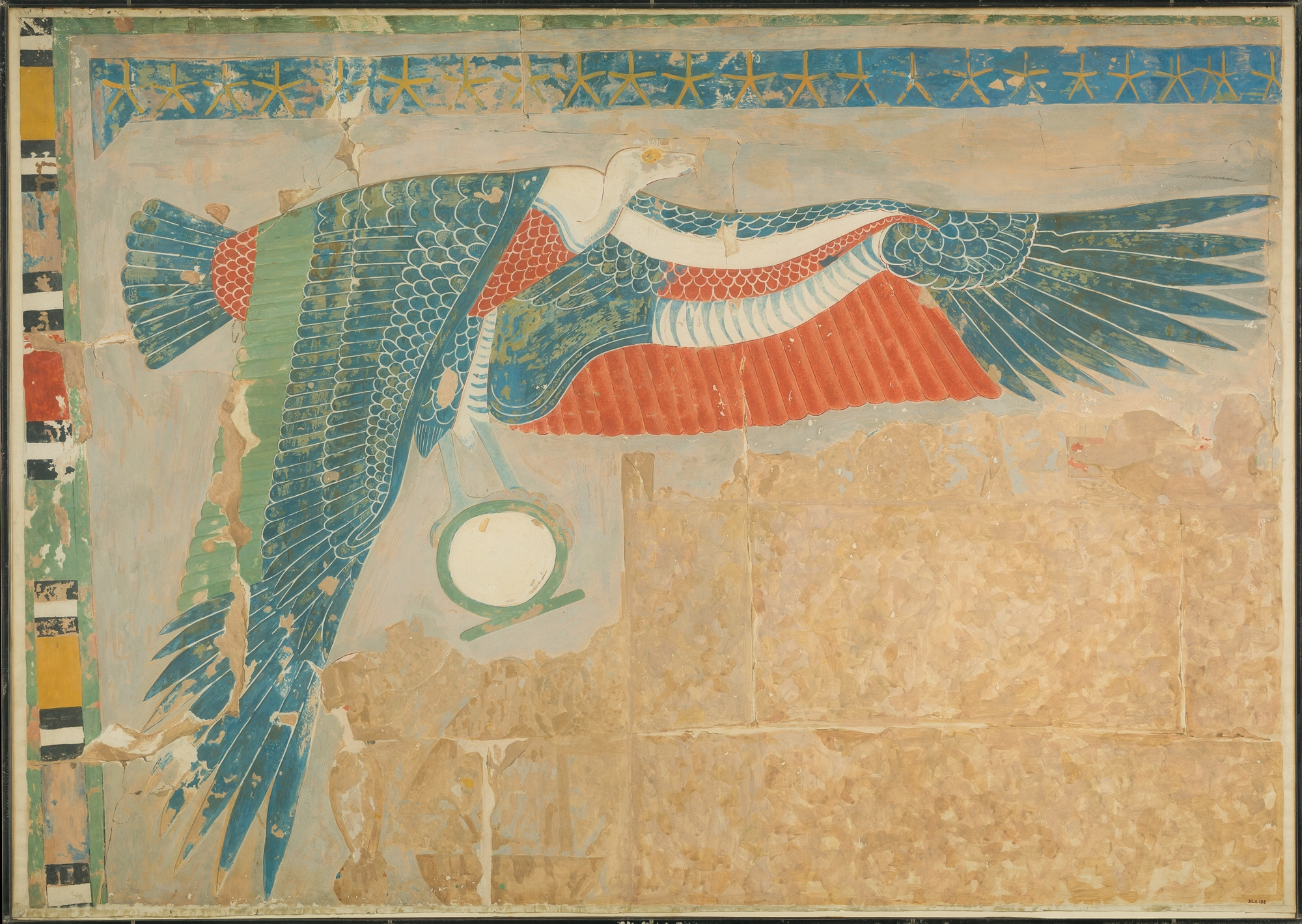
A painted relief depicting Nekhbet in Queen Hatshepsut's temple

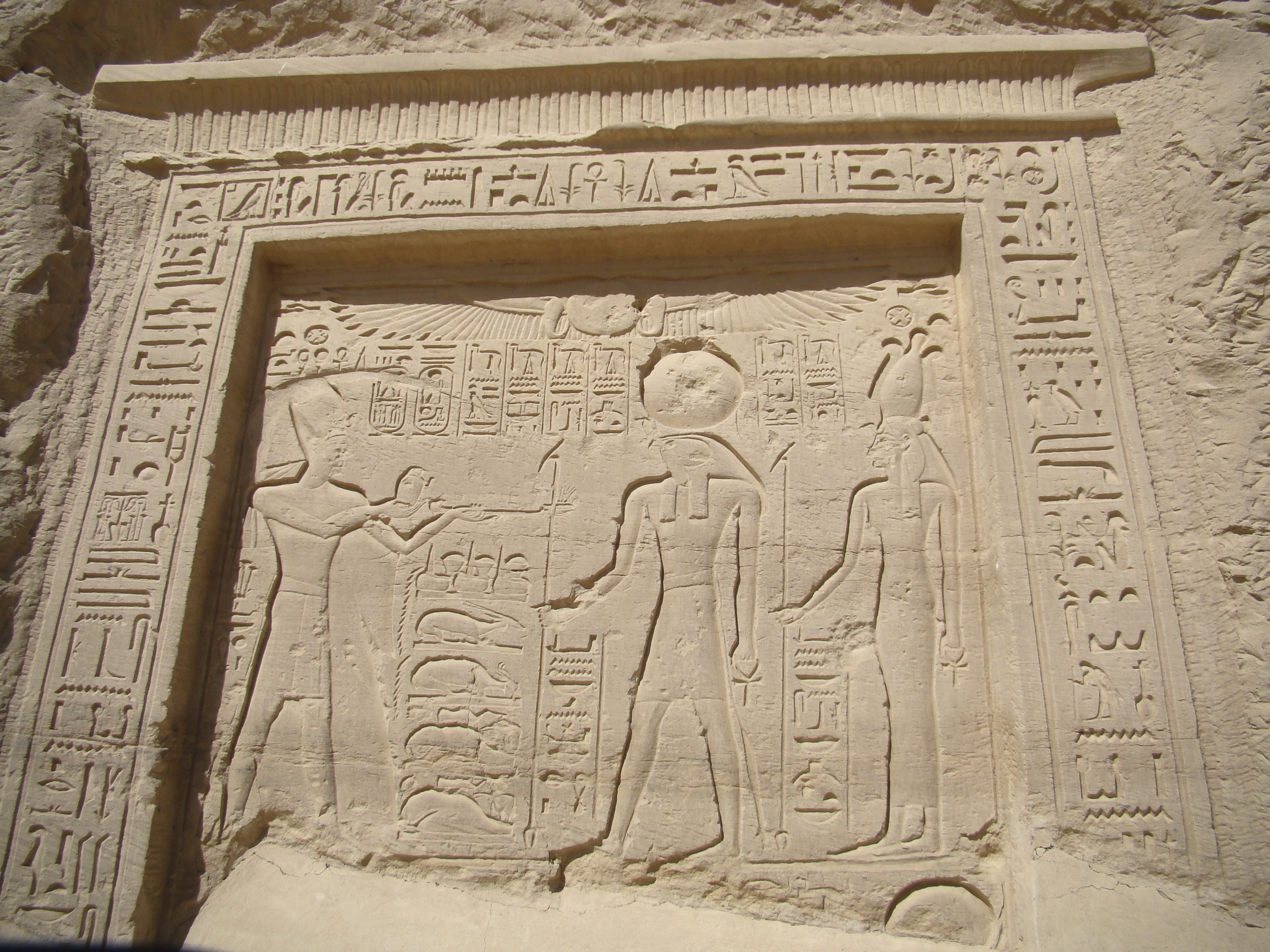
Relief from the Temple of Nekhbet at El Kab

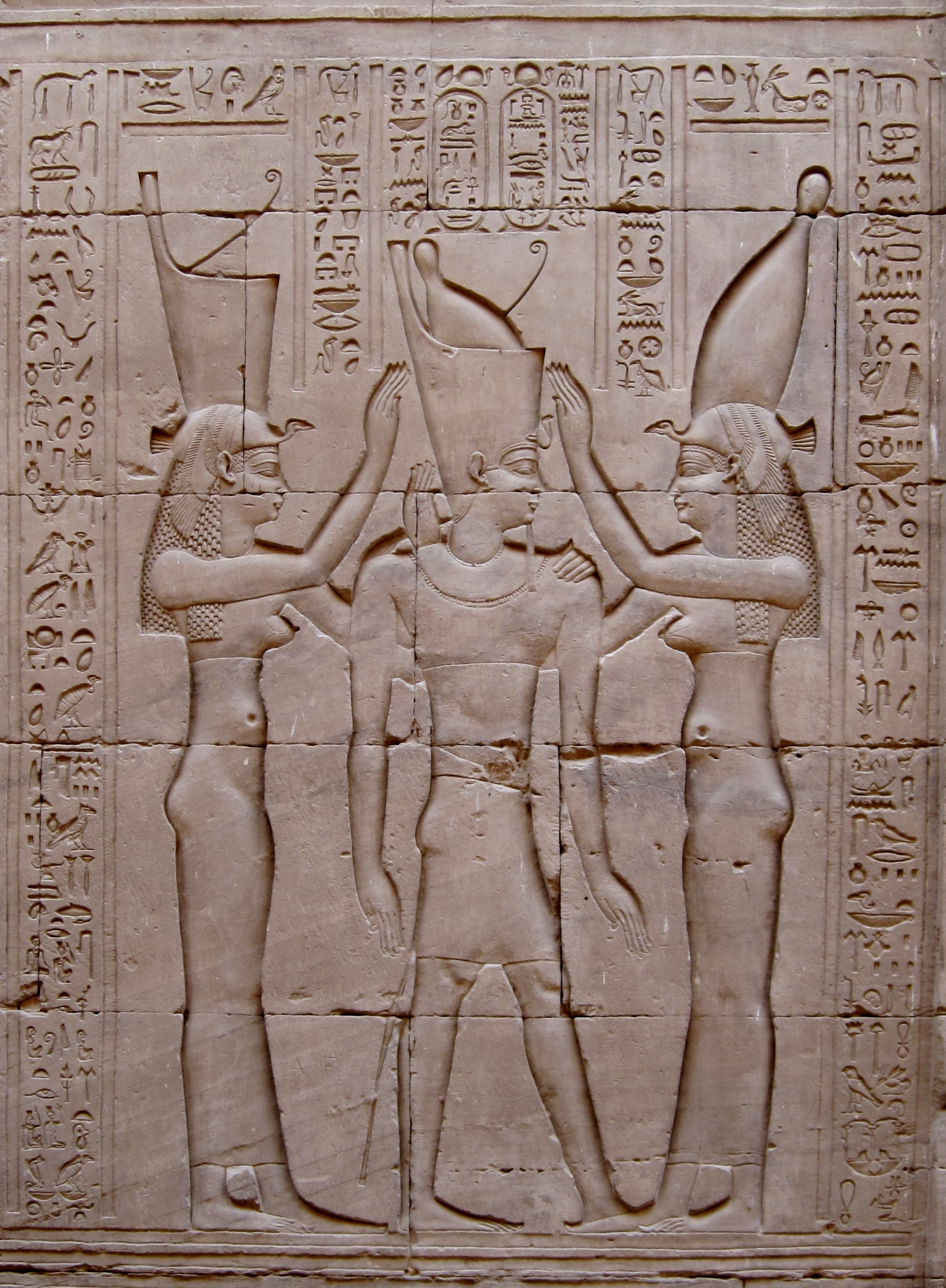
Nekhbet (right) and Wadjet (left) crowning Ptolemy VIII in the Temple of Edfu

== In popular culture ==
- Nekhbet is a bird-like monster in Final Fantasy XII.
- Nekhbet appears in Rick Riordan's The Throne of Fire as a minor antagonist.
- Nekhbet is the name of a pet vulture in the anime Tenshi ni Narumon.
- Nekhbet is an ascending goddess in the Dungeon Crawler Carl series.
