= Chariotry in ancient Egypt =

In ancient Egyptian society, primarily during the New Kingdom, chariotry stood as an independent unit in the king’s military force. It is thought that chariots came to Egypt with the Hyksos people as a weapon around 1700 BCE. The Egyptians later developed their own chariot design, which when compared to the Hyksos counterpart was lighter. Beyond their role in warfare, chariots seem to have a role in royal power both in and out of Egypt.

== Design ==
Archaeologist Joost Crouwel writes that "chariots were not sudden inventions but developed out of earlier vehicles that were mounted on disk or cross-bar wheels. This development can best be traced in the Near East, where spoke-wheeled and horse-drawn ‘true’ chariots are first attested in the earlier part of the second millennium BC...". The early usage of chariots was mainly for transportation purposes. With technological improvements to their structure (such as a "cross-bar" form of wheel construction to reduce the vehicle's weight), the use of chariots for military purposes began. Chariots were effective for their high speed, mobility and strength which could not be matched by infantry at the time. They quickly became a powerful new weapon across the ancient Near East.

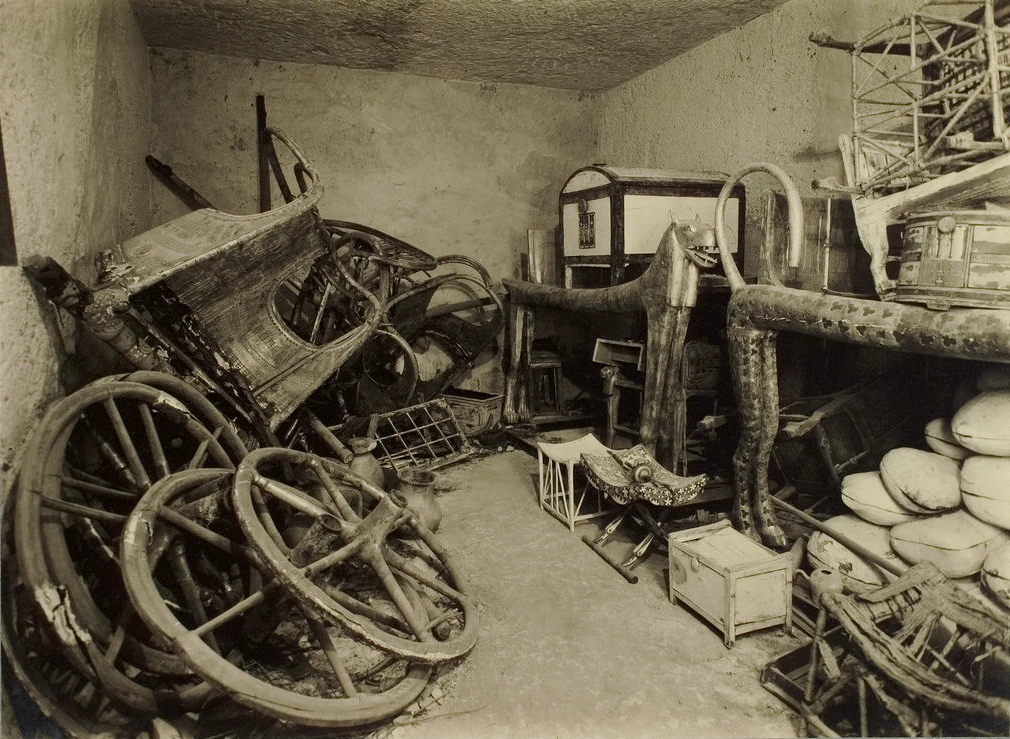
Deconstructed chariots found in the tomb of Tutankhamun

The Egyptian chariots were made using a more flexible wood and leather, compared to the solid wood frame used by the Hyksos chariots. Early chariots featured axles in the front or middle of the platform, however the Egyptians moved the axle to the back. This increased speed, maneuverability, and stability for the chariots. This enabled them to be faster and stronger when compared to the Hyksos Chariots, which may have played a large part in the military campaigns carried out.

The best-preserved examples of Egyptian chariots are the six specimens from the tomb of Tutankhamun. The six chariots varied in design. Archeologist Howard Carter called two of them "state chariots" and noted that they were hardly used before being placed in the tomb. Describing the chariots bodies as "thin wood boarding entirely covered with gesso and gold and further decorated with inlaid glass and ivory." The other four were more plainly decorated with wood and leather, however much of the leather has "perished."

== Chariots in warfare ==
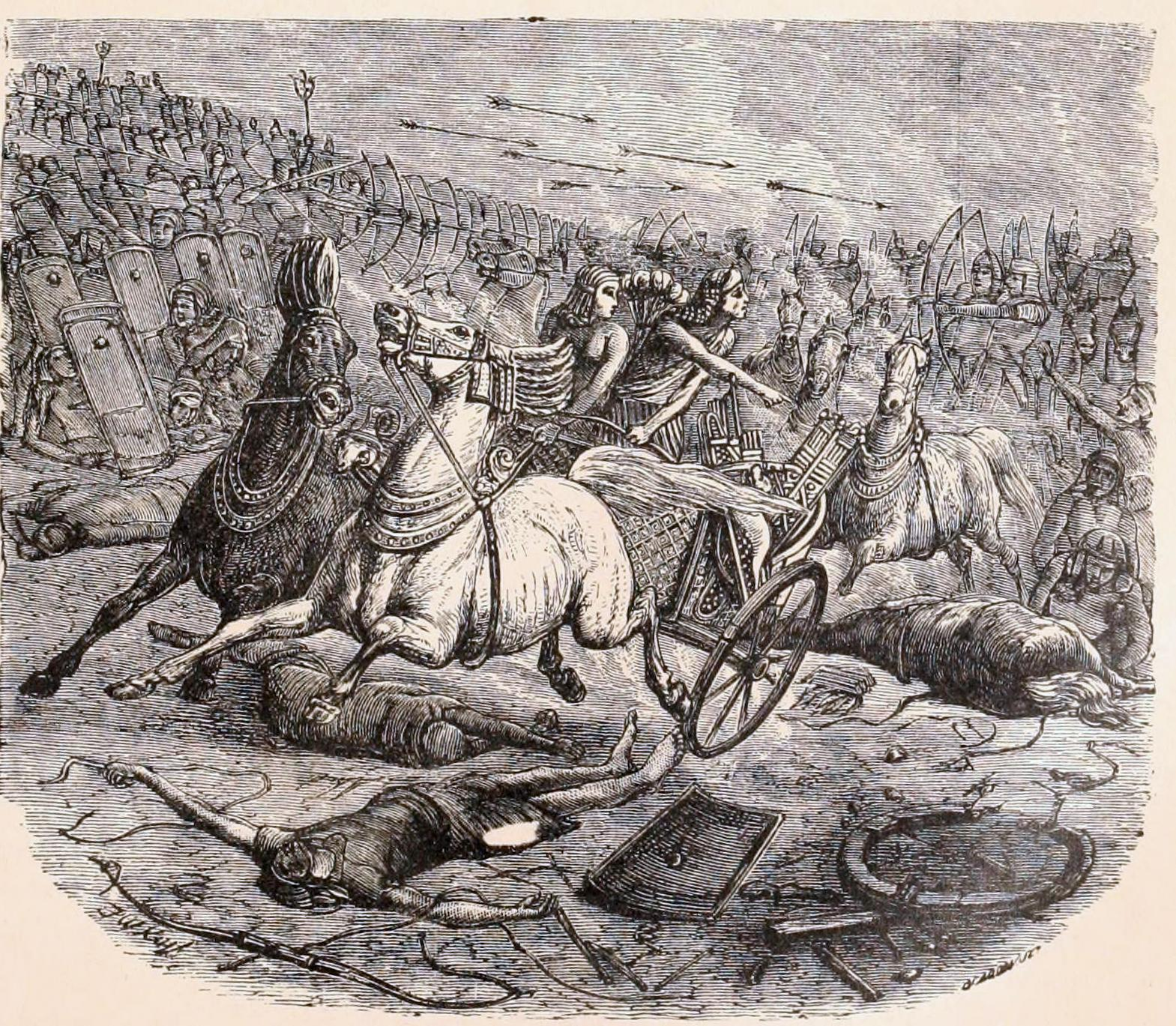
Egyptian War Chariot

Chariots were very expensive, heavy and prone to breakdowns, yet in contrast with early cavalry, chariots offered a more stable platform for archers. Chariots were also effective for archery because of the relatively long bows used, and even after the invention of the composite bow the length of the bow was not significantly reduced. Such a bow was difficult to handle while on horseback. The chariot had a driver and one man with a bow. A chariot could also carry more ammunition than a single rider.

However, the chariot also had several disadvantages, notably its size and its dependence on the right terrain. Their use has been compared to that of tanks in modern day warfare but this is disputed by scholars who point out that chariots were vulnerable, fragile and required a level terrain while tanks are heavily armored all-terrain vehicles. Chariots were thus not suitable for use in the way modern tanks have been used as a physical shock force.

Chariots would eventually form an elite force in the ancient Egyptian military. In field action, chariots usually delivered the first strike and were closely followed by infantry advancing to exploit the resulting breakthrough, somewhat similar to how infantry might operate behind a group of armed vehicles in modern warfare. These tactics would work best against lines of less-disciplined light infantry militia. Chariots, much faster than foot-soldiers, pursued and dispersed broken enemies to seal the victory. Egyptian light chariots contained one driver and one warrior; both might be armed with bow and spear.

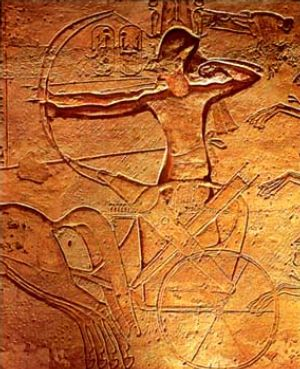
Ramses II fighting in a chariot at the Battle of Kadesh with two archers, one with the reins tied around his waist to free both hands. Relief from Abu Simbel.

In Ancient Egypt, members of the chariot corps formed their own aristocratic class known as the maryannu (young heroes). The heroic symbolism can be seen in contemporary paintings in which the King is shown riding with the elites, shooting arrows at the enemies. This image became typical of royal power iconography in the New Kingdom. As chariots become increasingly integrated into military training especially during the regime of Amenhotep II, the chariot warrior was identified as seneny and was paired with someone called keijen or kedjen, who also act as his defender. The seneny was trained to use the bow with accuracy even when the horse is at full gallop, a feat that Amenhotep II could reportedly do.

The best known and preserved textual evidence about Egyptian chariots in action was from the Battle of Kadesh during the reign of Ramses II, which was potentially the largest single chariot battle in history, probably featuring more than 5,000 chariots. Kamose (1555–1550) has the distinction of being the first Egyptian ruler to use the chariot and cavalry units in battle, giving him victory. Accounts reveal that the Hyksos, who were lording over the northern territories in his reign, were startled when Egyptian chariots started to roll in the battlefield at Nefrusy, north of Cusae (near modern Asyut). The chariots were improved versions of what they used to terrorize the enemy.

== Chariots outside war ==
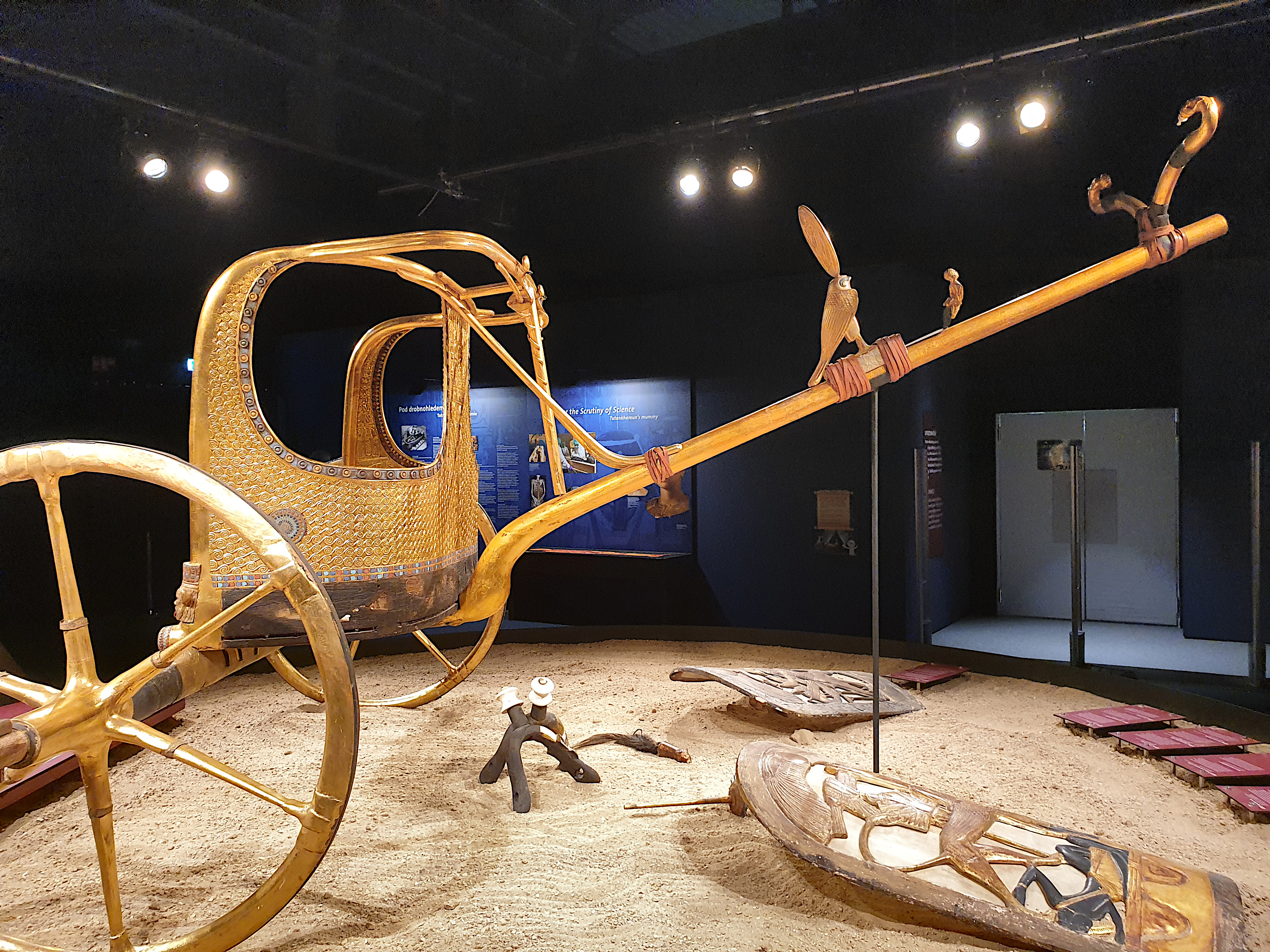
A replica made of a chariot found in the tomb of Tutankhamun

The Amarna letters feature chariots throughout them. A standard greeting used in many Amarna letters goes like this, "For you may all go well. For your household, your wives, your sons, your magnates, your troops, your horses, your chariots, and in your countries, may all go well. For me all goes well. For my household, my wives, my sons, my magnates, my many troops, my horses, my chariots, and in my countries, all goes very, very well." This greeting appears in Amarna letter number 5. However, similar versions appear in many other Amarna letters. This shows the level of importance placed on chariots during the Amarna period in Egypt.

Also found in the Amarna letters is the appearance of them as a greeting gift sent between royals. One such instance of this was a chariot described as being "overlaid with gold", that was given out as a gift to the King Burna-Buriash II of Karduniaš.

Outside of the Amarna period, we often see Pharaoh's display themselves on chariots in reliefs that depict warfare. A notable example of this is the many reliefs of Ramses II that he had put up, describing the Battle of Kadesh. Throughout the inscriptions he describes how he fought the opposing army alongside Amun from his chariot.

Notably they may have been a tomb good for royal elites as 6 deconstructed chariots were found in the tomb of Tutankhamun. Only two were described as "state chariots" by archaeologist Howard Carter and were heavily decorated.
