= Shen ring =

Ancient Egyptian symbol

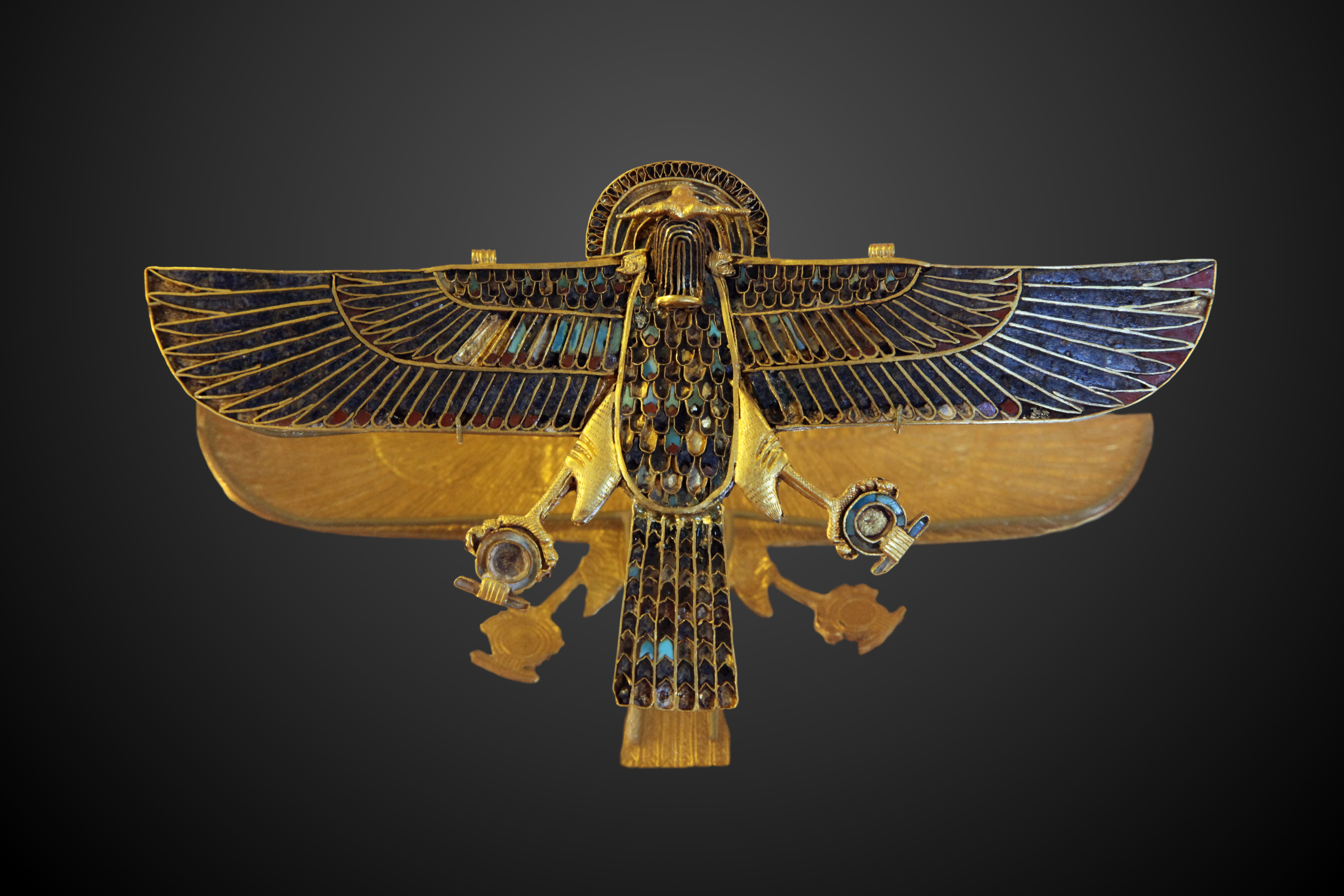
A ram-headed bird representing the ba of Ra with shen rings in its grasp. (Louvre Museum)

In ancient Egypt, a shen ring was a circle with a line tangent to it, represented in hieroglyphs as a stylised loop of a rope, bound to a stick. The tool was used by builders and architects. Shen rings can most often be seen in the clutches of Horus. The word shen itself means "encircling" in ancient Egyptian, while the shen ring itself represents eternal protection. What the French called a cartouche is in fact an elongated shen ring encircling a name of a pharaoh or god/goddess, thus "eternally protecting" that personage.

In Gardiner's sign list, it is sign V9.

V9
shen
šn
in hieroglyphs

Gardiner: V9

== Shen ring use in iconography ==
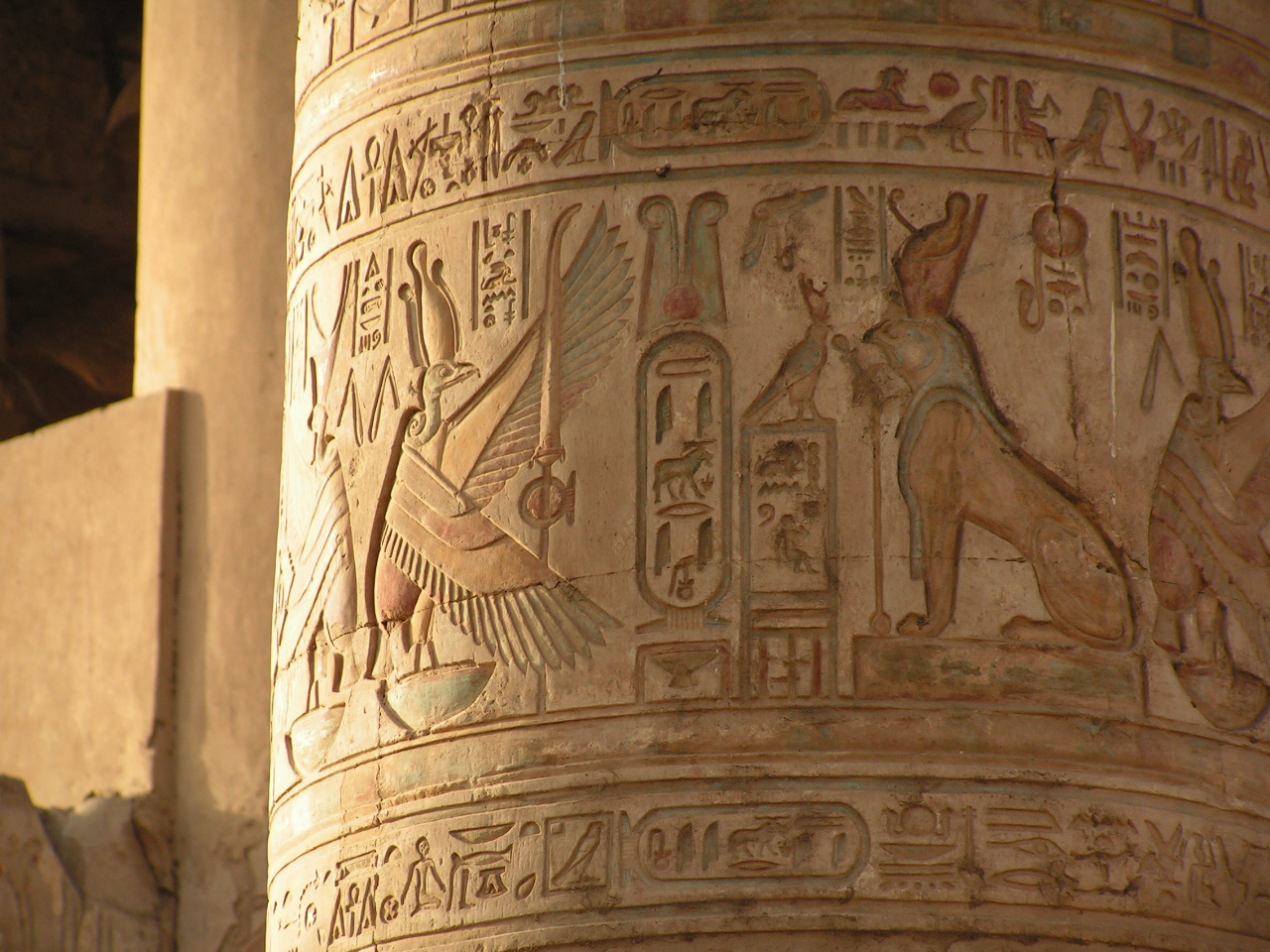
Kom Ombo, Goddess Nekhbet's staff with shen ring

The shen ring is most often seen carried by the falcon god Horus, but was also carried by the vulture goddess Nekhbet. It was used as early as the Third Dynasty where it can be seen in the reliefs from Djoser's Step Pyramid complex.

The symbol could be stretched to contain other objects, which were then understood as being eternally protected by the shen ring. In its elongated form the shen ring became the cartouche, which enclosed and protected a royal name.

- The Goddess Heqet, (the 'Frog'), is often seated on a shenu.
- For Eternity, the renpit, a palm rib with the leaflets removed, is usually based on top of a Shen ring. See the Egyptian god Huh. (Senusret I has a famous Lintel relief showing this.)
- The shen ring is often attached to various types of staffs, the staff of authority, or power, symbolizing the Eternal authority of that power.
- The Goddess Isis, and the Goddess Nekhbet are often shown kneeling, with their hands resting upon a shenu.
- The Hawk (Horus), and the Vulture (Goddess Mut) have the shenu in their talons, wings outstretched, over the scene portrayed. The "Horus with Outstretched Wings", shenus in its talons, is an example from the Louvre of a Pectoral Brooch, possibly for royalty.

Outside of Egypt, a Tartessian archaeological site, Cancho Roano in southern Spain, has a shen ring-shaped altar.

== See also ==
- Cartouche
- Huh (god)
- Rod and ring symbol
- Two whips with shen ring (hieroglyph)
