= Union symbol (hieroglyph) =

Egyptian hieroglyph

F36
Union-symbol
(Lung and
Trachea)

sma
in hieroglyphs

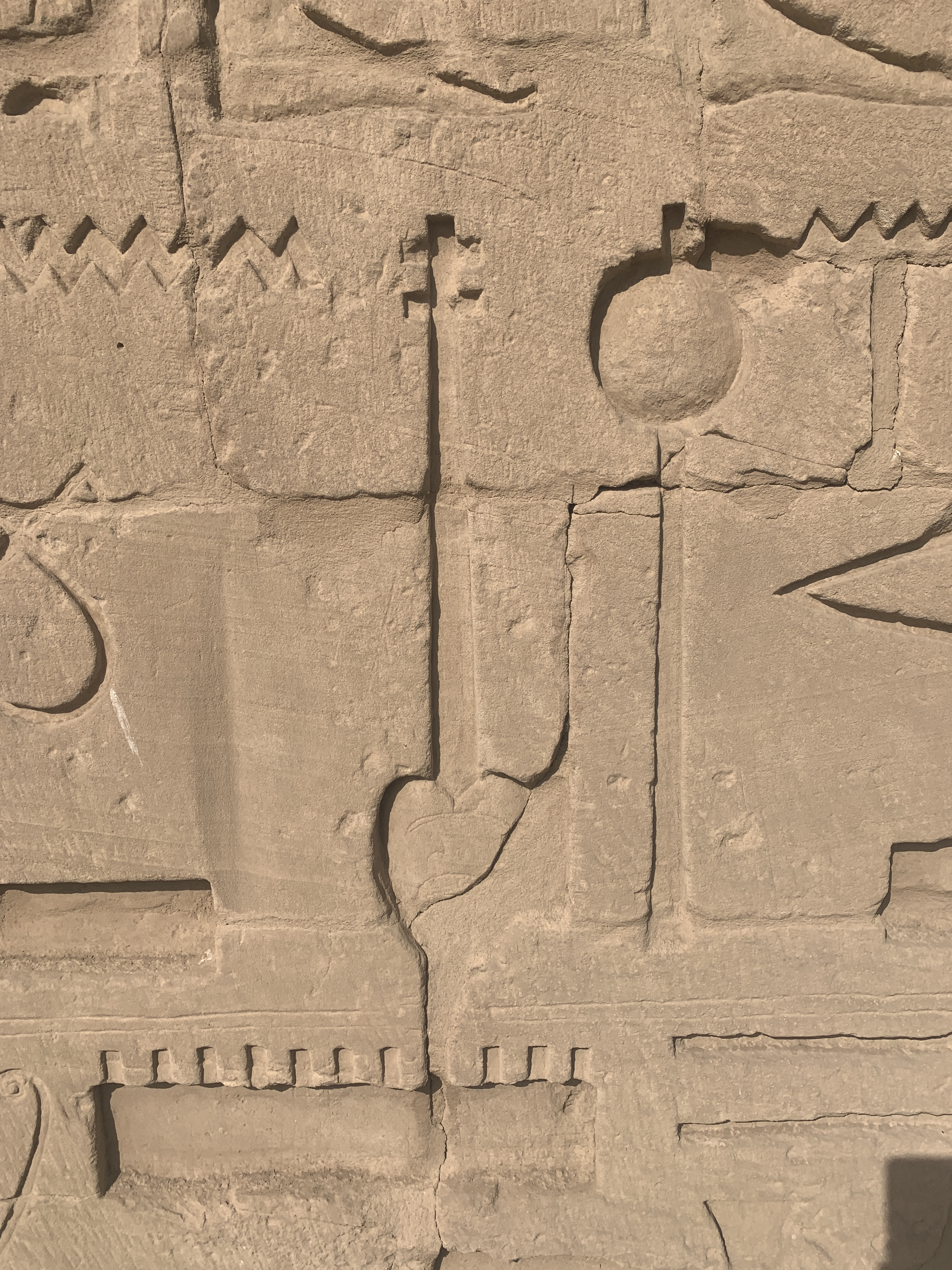
Union symbol in an inscription at the temple of Amun-Ra in Karnak

The Union symbol (hieroglyph) is Gardiner sign listed no. F36, part of the series for parts of mammals. As a "union symbol", (a right and left half), it contains a vertical invisible 'centerline'. It allows for the positioning of two important hieroglyphs to be attached to it, right and left, as the uniting of two halves; specifically this is referencing Upper Egypt (by the King of the South), represented by the sedge hieroglyph (M23) M23 and Lower Egypt (the King of the North), represented by the papyrus clump hieroglyph (M16) M16.

In Egyptian hieroglyphs, the hieroglyph is used for the phonetic value of sma, (a triliteral) with meanings of to join together, to unite with.

For its use as "uniting of two lands", it has an identical usage to the Two whips with shen ring hieroglyph Aa6, which from its very construction appears as the uniting of two separate "tribes", or communities.
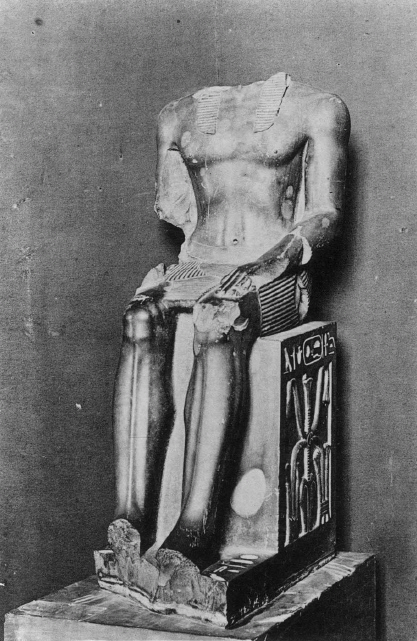
Chephren's seated statue

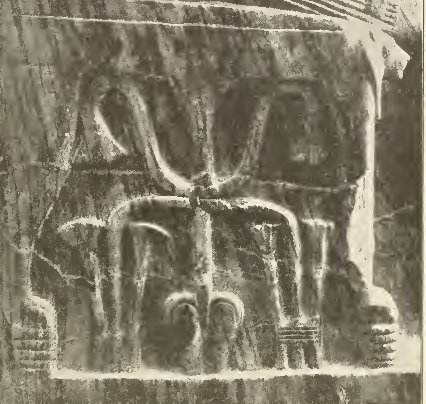
Detail of Chephren's statue

== See also ==
- Two whips with shen ring (hieroglyph)
- Gardiner's Sign List#F. Parts of mammals
- List of Egyptian hieroglyphs
