= Two whips with shen ring (hieroglyph) =

Egyptian hieroglyph

S23
Two Whips
with Shen ring
in hieroglyphs

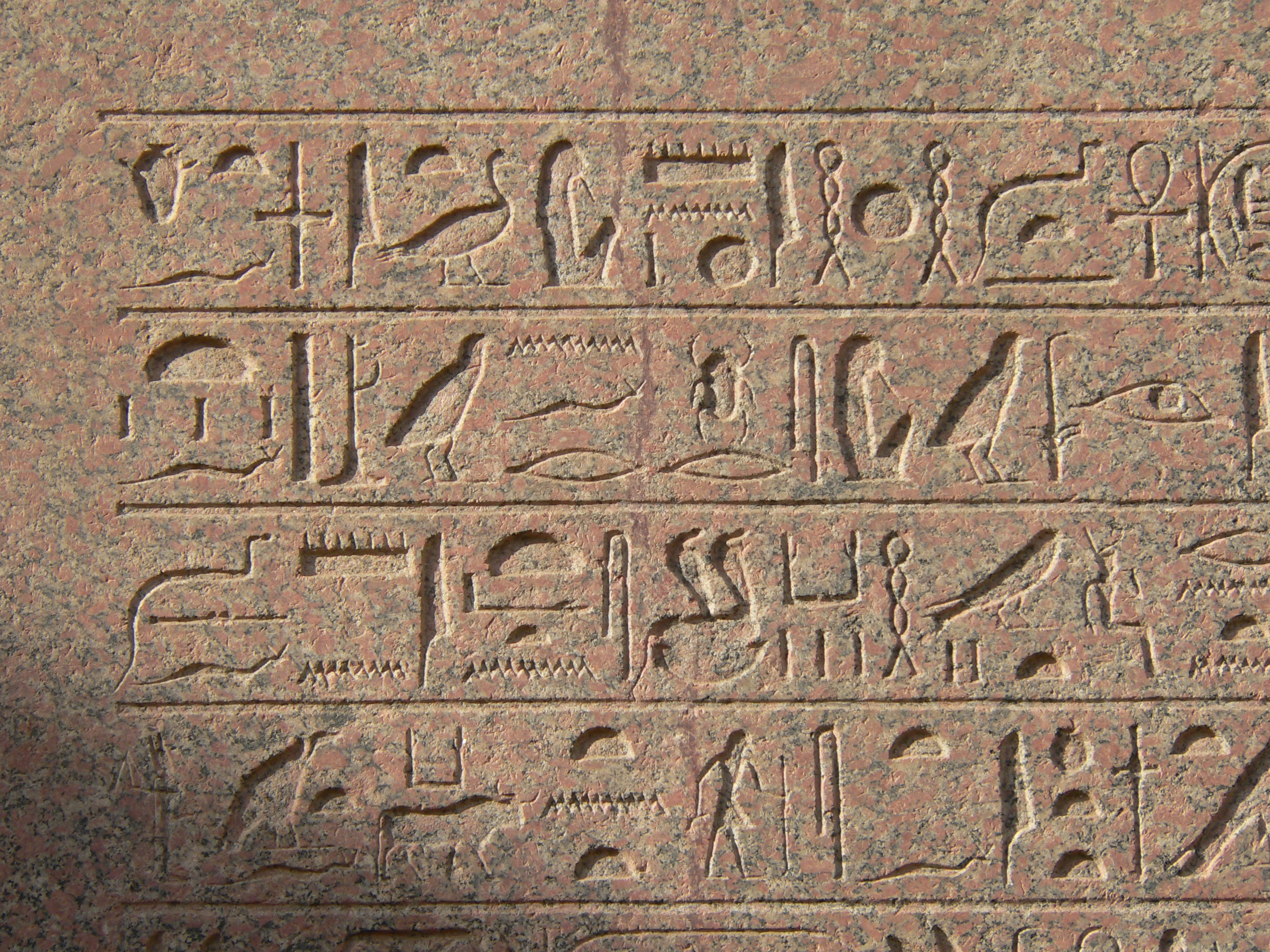
(Example hieroglyph relief)

The ancient Egyptian Two Whips with Shen ring hieroglyph, Gardiner sign listed no. S23 is a portrayal of the Shen ring with two Egyptian flails-(Crook and flail); it is a member of the Gardiner subset for "crowns, dress, staves, etc".

In the Egyptian language, the hieroglyph is used as an ideogram or determinative for words meaning to unite. In the language it is used for dm(dj)-(dmḏ).

A second form of the hieroglyph uses only one whip and shen ring, and implies 'opposite', the opposite of "to unite".

== See also ==
- Gardiner's Sign List#S. Crowns, Dress, Staves, etc.
- List of Egyptian hieroglyphs
- Shen ring
