= Bronze Sphinx of Thutmose III =

Ancient Egyptian statuette

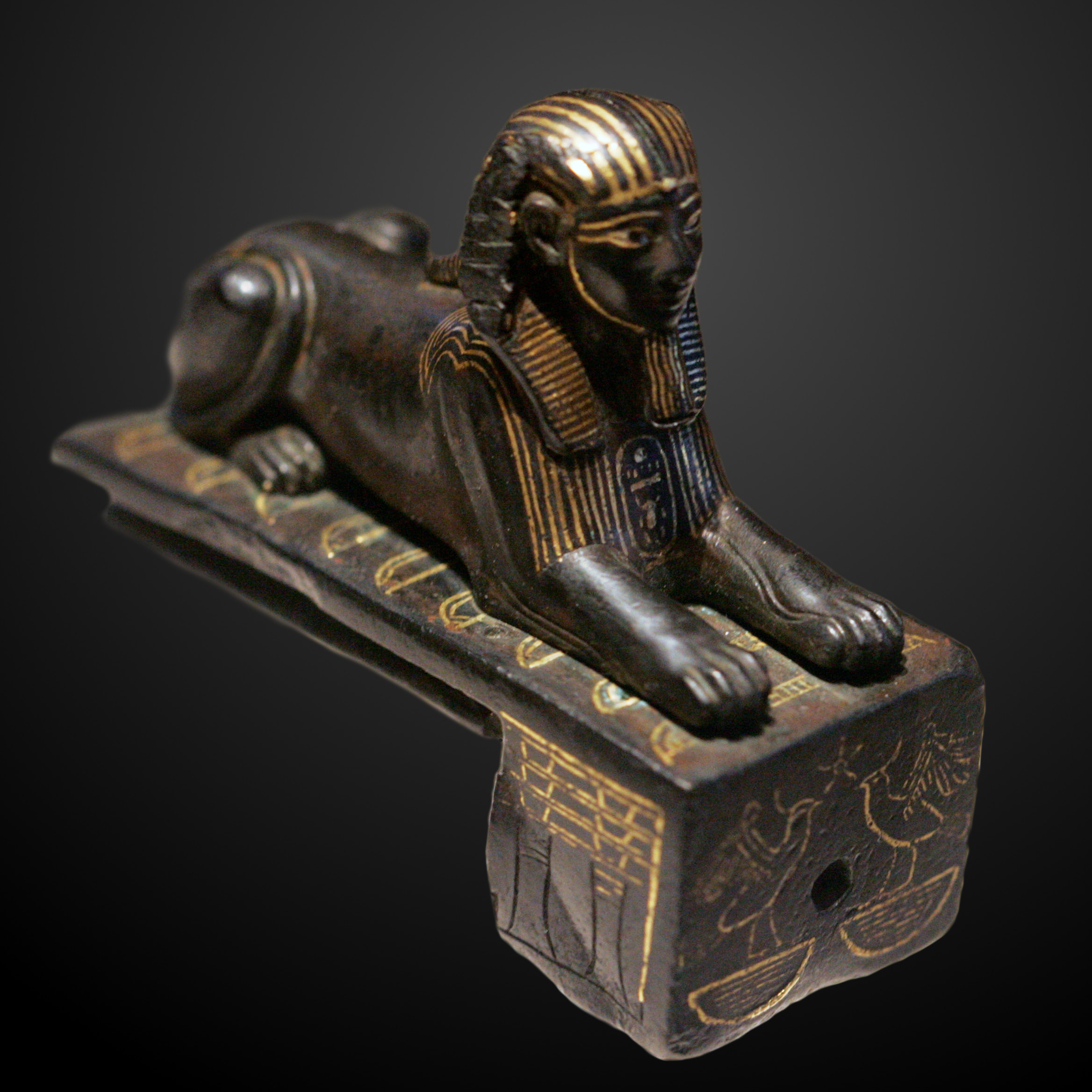
- Material: Bronze
- Length: 8.85 cm
- Height: 7.8 cm
- Width: 3.85 cm
- Created: c. 1450 BC
- Present location: Louvre Museum, Ile-de-France, France
- Identification: E 10897

The Bronze Sphinx of Thutmose III is a statuette of a sphinx made during the 18th Dynasty of Egypt under the reign of Thutmose III, who ruled from c. 1458 to 1425 BC. Adorned with multiple symbols of royal power, it might have been an element or a lock. It was purchased by the Louvre in 1826, and is part of the permanent collections in the display case 4 in Room 637 (formerly 24), Sully Wing, first floor.

== Symbolism ==
The statuette is adorned with gold inlays highlighting symbols of royal power. The sphinx depicts the Pharaoh reclining on the Nine bows, which represent the traditional enemies of Egypt brought to submission. The front of the statuette uses the lapwing Rekhyt bird to spell "all the people give praise", using the basket hieroglyph V30 ("nb") for "all"' the lapwing hieroglyph G24 𓅛 ("rḫyt") for "the people" and the star hieroglyph N14 𓇼 for "praising" (this is a rebus). Djed pillars of "Dominion" adorn on the side of the statuette.

Views and details
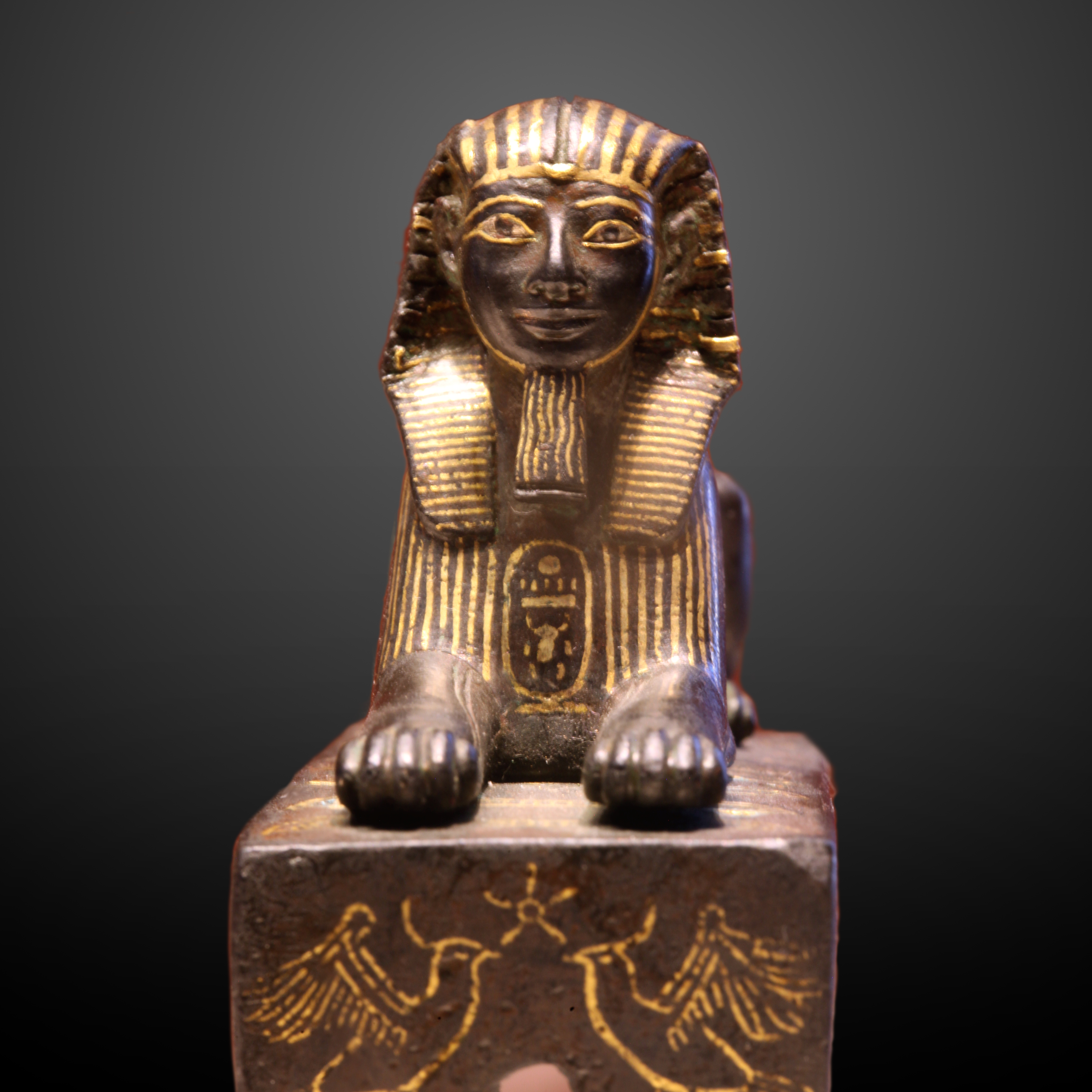
Front view of the cartouche clearly visible

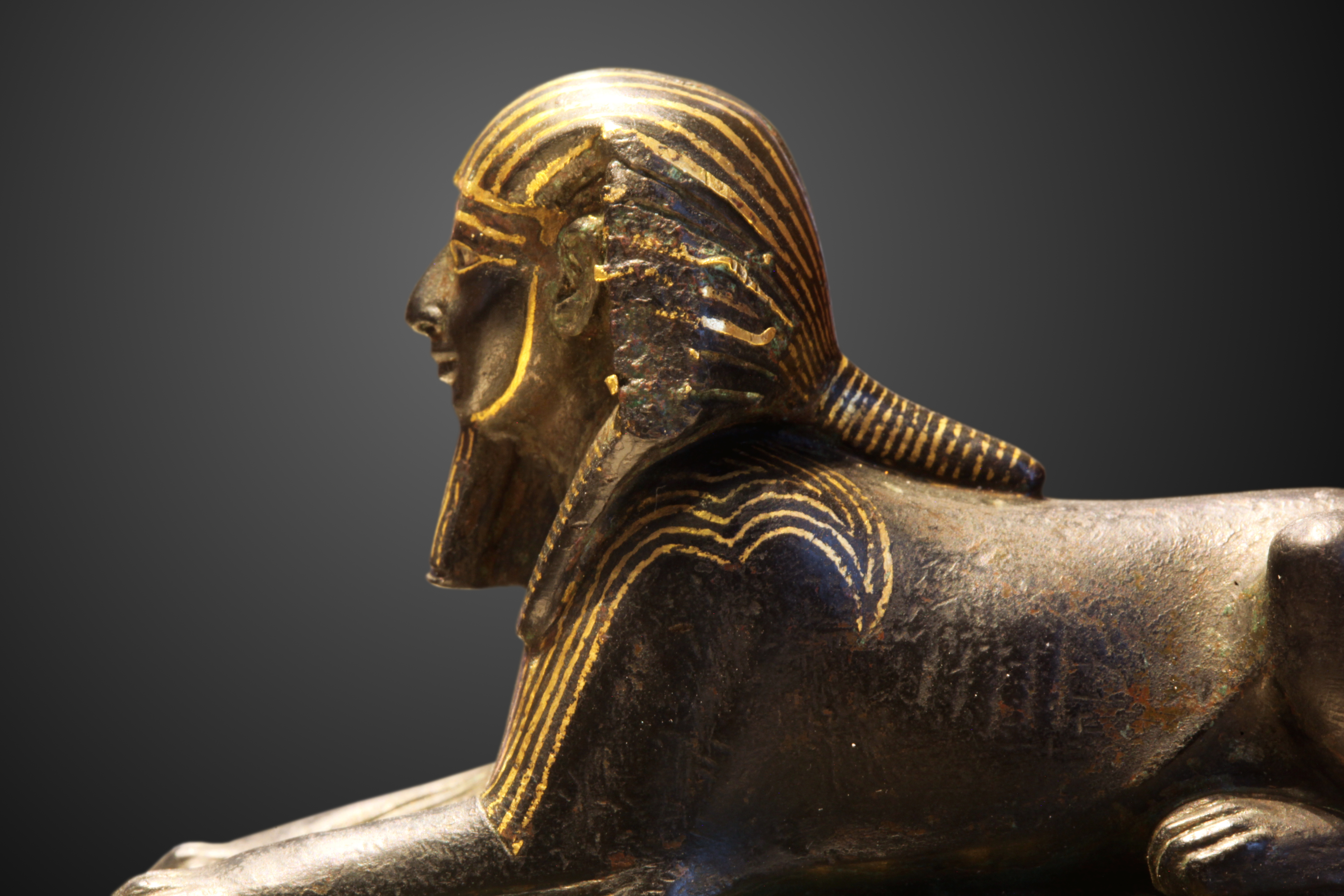
Detail of the profile with the nemes

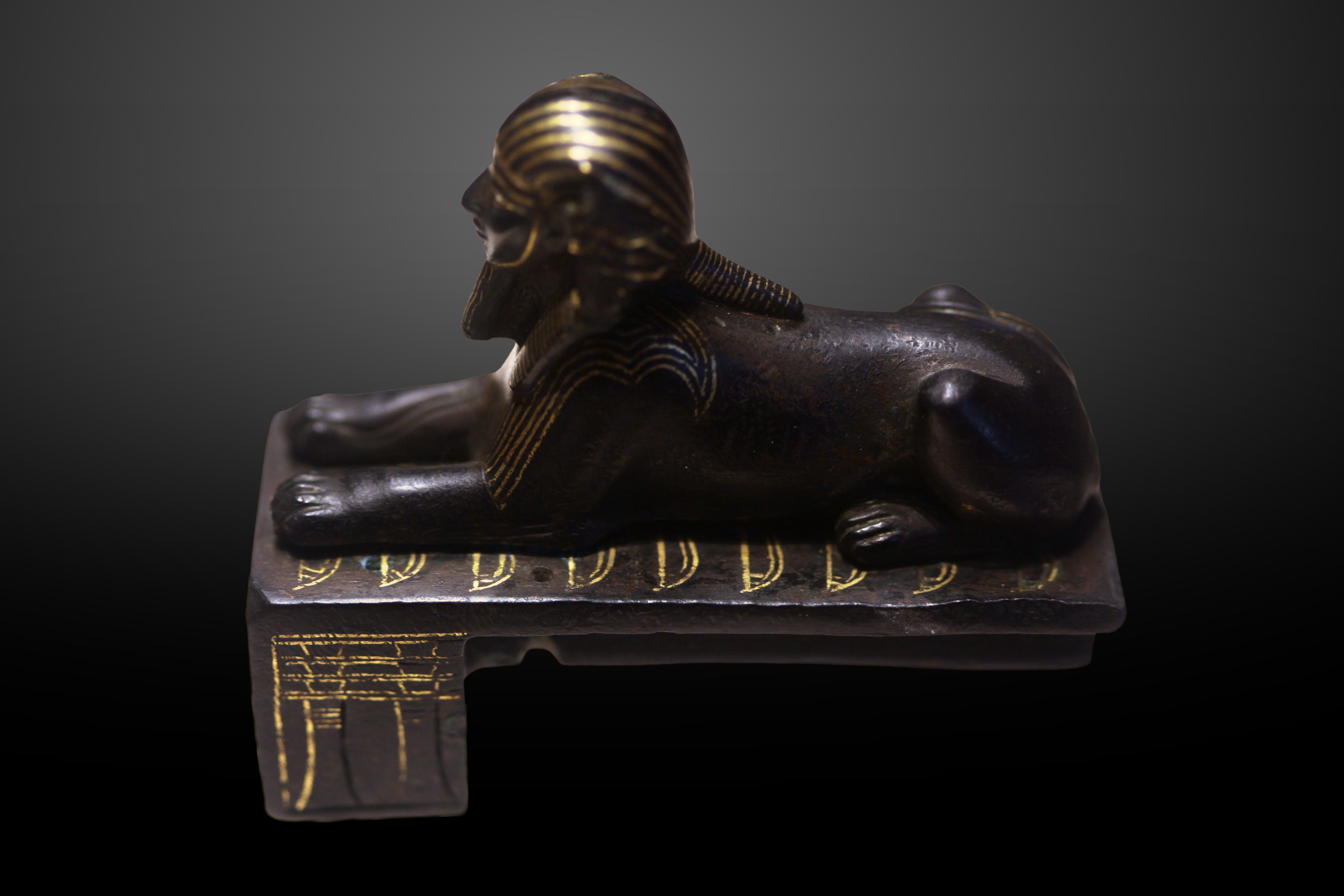
The Nine Bows and the Djed pillars of Dominion

== Sources and references ==
- Sphinx de Thoutmosis III, Louvre Museum
