= Rekhyt =

Ancient Egyptian word

Rekhyt in hieroglyphs
D21 Aa1 M17 M17 X1 G23 G23 G23
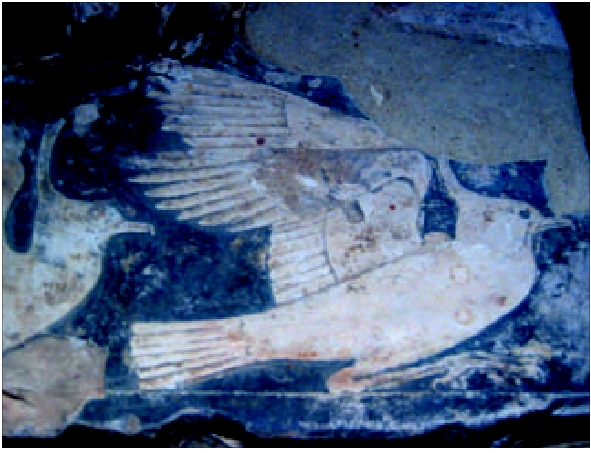
- Rekhyt under the feet of Djoser (Statue) (Egyptian Museum in Cairo)

The word Rekhyt from Ancient Egyptian: rḫyt, also romanized as Rechit, referred to a people living in the northern Nile Delta in the Early Dynastic Period of Ancient Egypt, as well as the deity Rekhyt from the Middle Kingdom onwards. The Rekhyt people's origins are unclear, as they were not yet considered Egyptians at the beginning of the 3rd millennium BC. Their settlement area extended to the border of Retjenu. Early inscriptions and monuments speak of the Rekhyt as mythological inhabitants of the Nile Delta, as all "northern enemies of Upper Egypt" were also among the "inhabitants of Qebehu".

After the collapse of the Old Kingdom and the associated upheaval and religious reorientation, the meaning of the term "Rekhyt" changed. At the beginning of the Middle Kingdom, the name "Rekhyt" was transferred to a new deity. The Rekhyt no longer appeared as a separate people; instead the Egyptians saw a connection with Horus in the earlier Rekhyt people, especially from the New Kingdom onwards. The popular name Rekhyt and its associated meaning was subject to change, and the word Rekhyt came to mean "the common people" as a generic term.

== Name ==
=== Etymology ===
The lapwing is a migratory bird that overwinters from late October to late March in Siwa, Alexandria, Faiyum, Bubastis, Pithom and North Sinai. Their wings are distinctively wide and rounded, and they fly with relaxed, leisurely wing beats. The black upper side and white underside, which flash in flight, allows them to be easily identified from a great distance. It is understood that the name of the bird was first applied to the Rekhyt people as a nickname.

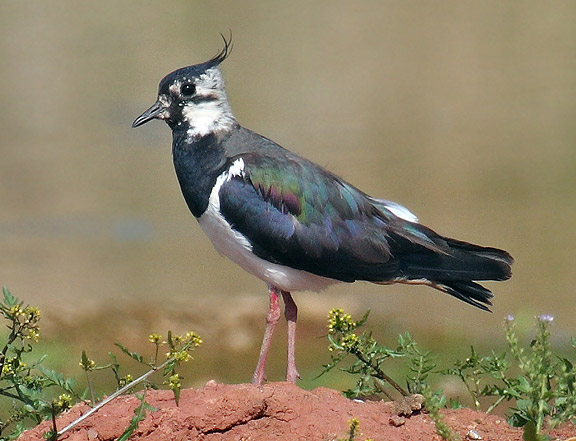
Northern lapwing (Vanellus vanellus)

The ancient Egyptians saw the lapwing as a "clumsy mourning bird in the mud" due to its "slowly staggering-fluttering herd flight behavior" and its typical long drawn-out cry "pliit".

The assumption was often made earlier in Egyptology that the name Rekhyt written with the single hieroglyph G23

G23

was written as a transmission of the lapwing. However, this was an unprovable assumption and had to be corrected. A people must have a collective name, the name of an individual bird cannot be a collective noun. Rather, the word "Rekhyt" derived from the behavior and appearance of the lapwing that basic meaning after which the ethnic group was later named, with Rekhyt as an ethnonym referring to the singular nouns "Rekh" and "Rekhet".

=== Origin ===
The appearance of the lapwing was unknown to the inhabitants of Upper Egypt, as the lapwing did not migrate to the regions around Abydos. In the sun temple of Niuserre, the lapwing is therefore described as the "bird from Qebehu". In the early days, the people of Rekhyt were mostly opposed to the Upper Egyptian people of the Pat, who saw themselves as the "people of Seth and Kenmet". In armed conflicts, the defeated also carried the designation "Rekhyt", which is why they were also regarded as legitimate subjects. For example, in the story of the Henmemet of the Old Kingdom, the sun god Ra was victorious against the people of Rekhyt.

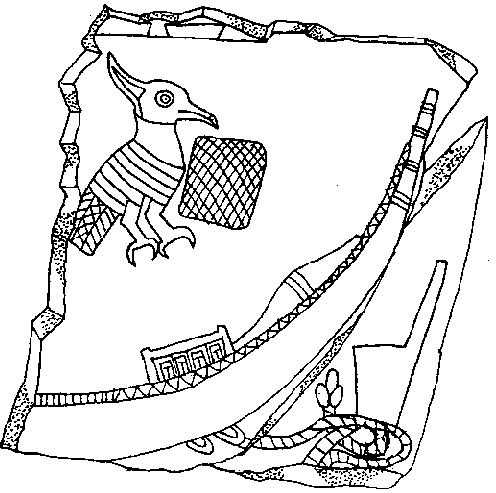
Bound Rekhyt with cage (Lapwing Palette)

The translation made by Alan Gardiner with the exclusive meaning "lower class, rebels, vanquished, enemies of Egypt" has been modified in the meantime, as the expression Rekhyt was ambiguous. In the early dynastic period, "Rekhyt" mostly referred to the enemies of Egypt as well as prisoners and subjects. In the eastern region of Sais, a fragment of a slate palette depicting a barque has been found dating to the reigns of Scorpion II and Ka. Due to the detailed representation of a lapwing on the bow with the determinative of a cage, the find is called the "Lapwing Palette". Its place of origin is unknown.

To the Ancient Egyptians, the “residences of the lapwing” referred to the area around Lower Egypt. With the beginning of the Old Kingdom, the meaning of the term "Rekhyt" was expanded to denote "peasants and craftsmen". In Egyptology, therefore, the question discussed is whether the Rekhyt have always been at home in the Nile Delta or whether they settled there later. Due to the scattered Rekhyt places of residence, it is understandable that they were considered among the hostile Nine bows.

=== Depiction ===
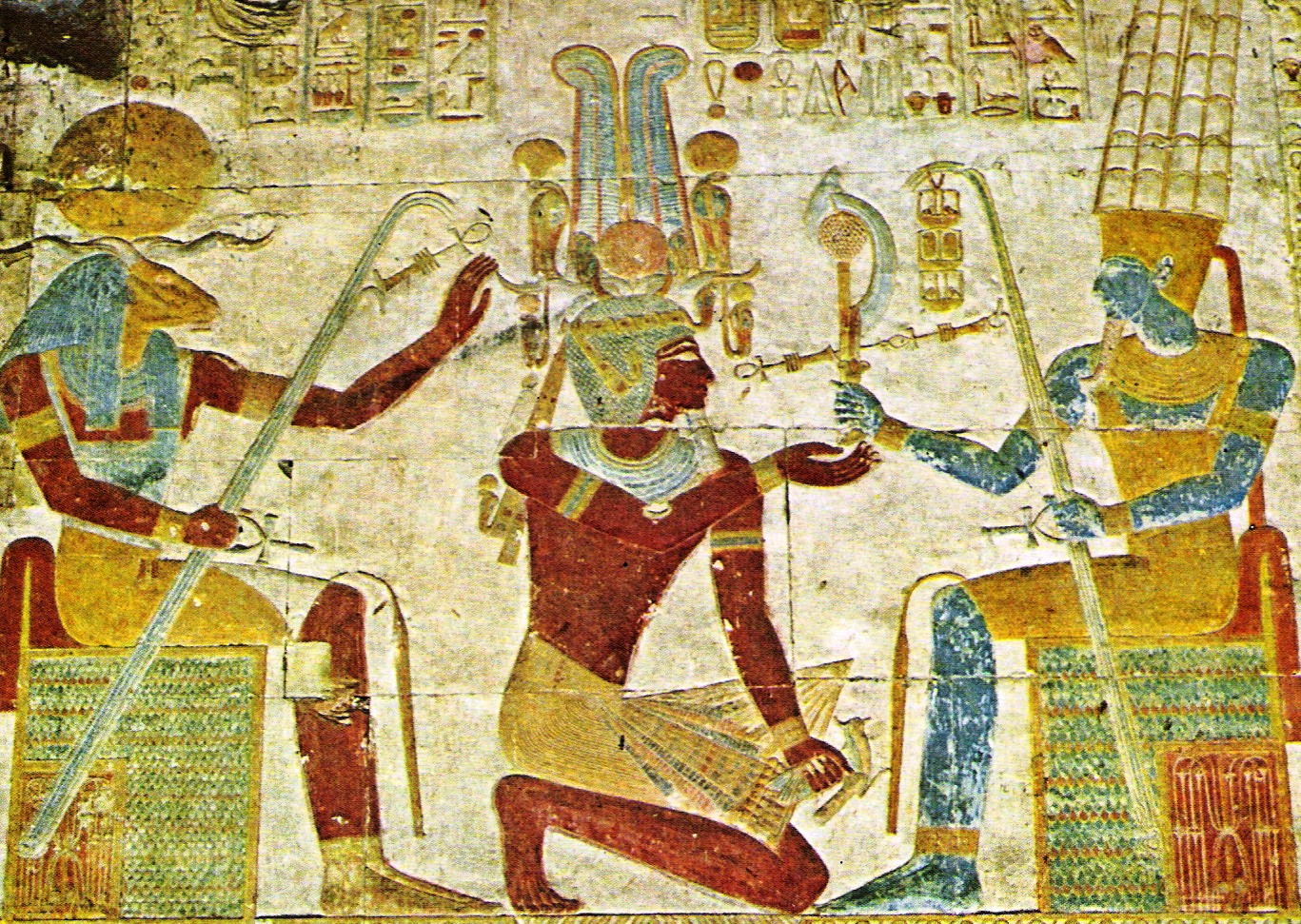
Seti I (Rekhyt in his hand)

In Egyptian temples, the Rekhyt were described together with the two other strata of the population, the Pat (pꜥt, 'Patricians') and Henmemet (ḥnmmt, 'Sun-people' (of Heliopolis)), as a three-part social system of the ancient Egyptian Maat. In addition, "foreigners and enemies" were depicted in temple decorations as a Pendant to them, representing chaos. The pharaoh combined both aspects of ancient Egyptian society, which is why he can often be seen on "standing on the vanquished" or "with the people in his hand". The statues of pharaohs standing on Rekhyt underline their "ruling over the Rekhyt".

As a symbol of the Egyptian servant population, the kings held the Rekhyt tightly in their hands. On the western wall of the second hypostyle hall in the Temple of Seti I in Abydos is a relief of Seti I, in which Seti kneels with the two-feather crown during his coronation before Amun-Re, to be appointed the rightful king of Egypt. Seti holds a Rekhyt lapwing in his left hand as a sign that all people in Egypt are under his rule. In his right hand is the Khopesh sword and a mace-axe which he receives from Amun-Re to ensure victory in battle.

== Early Dynastic Period and Old Kingdom ==
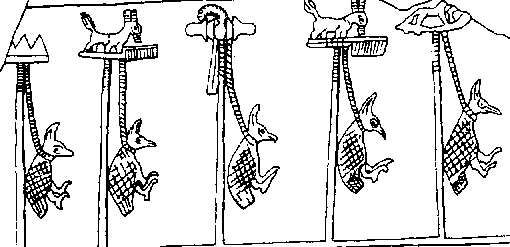
Rekhyt on the Scorpion Macehead

Rekhyt can be seen on the Scorpion Macehead. The scene is interpreted as a victory of King Scorpion II over the Rekhyt people. However, the Rekhyt standards might symbolically represent the control of Scorpion over different areas of Egypt, not necessarily with military conflict. In addition, the creation of irrigation ditches or channels by Scorpion and other people can be seen.

In the Royal Annals of the Old Kingdom, which include the Palermo Stone, the Rekhyt are mentioned twice under King Den of the First Dynasty. In the fourth year of his reign, the reading "People of the Rekhyt" can be made in an otherwise unclear context. In the 31st year of reign, the Rekhyt or their settlement areas play a role in connection with an administrative action carried out by Den. In 1987, Egyptologist Wolfgang Helck translated the difficult passage as "Plan (?) And dig the western and eastern canals (through) the area of the Rekhyt". However, Helck’s reading is based on the interpretation of the pond hieroglyph

N37

as canal

N36

and the symbol V23 (“mehu”)

V23

as F30 (“schedj”)

F30

Overall, Helck's assumption fits very well, since such canal construction work was previously documented by King Scorpion II and later in the Old Kingdom. In 2000, Toby Wilkinson submitted a slightly modified translation to Helck regarding the 31st year of Den's reign, which adhered to the given hieroglyphs: “Organization? of farms? the north-western delta (Rekhyt) and all people in the eastern delta.” Wilkinson remarked at his reading that it was also only to be regarded as an interpretation. Anedjib (circa 2910 BC) noted another massive flooding of the Nile in the year after his Sed festival, which affected all north-western districts and triggered a mass epidemic among the Rekhyt people. The earliest representation of the Rekhyt in the Old Kingdom is a statue in Djoser's pyramid complex, which shows three Rekhyt birds with their wings under Djoser's feet in connection with the "Nine Bows". The hieroglyph

G24

was used for the representation of the Rekhyt. This motif was one of the king's rulership attributes and expressed his power over Egypt and its neighboring regions.

== Deity ==
Rekhyt
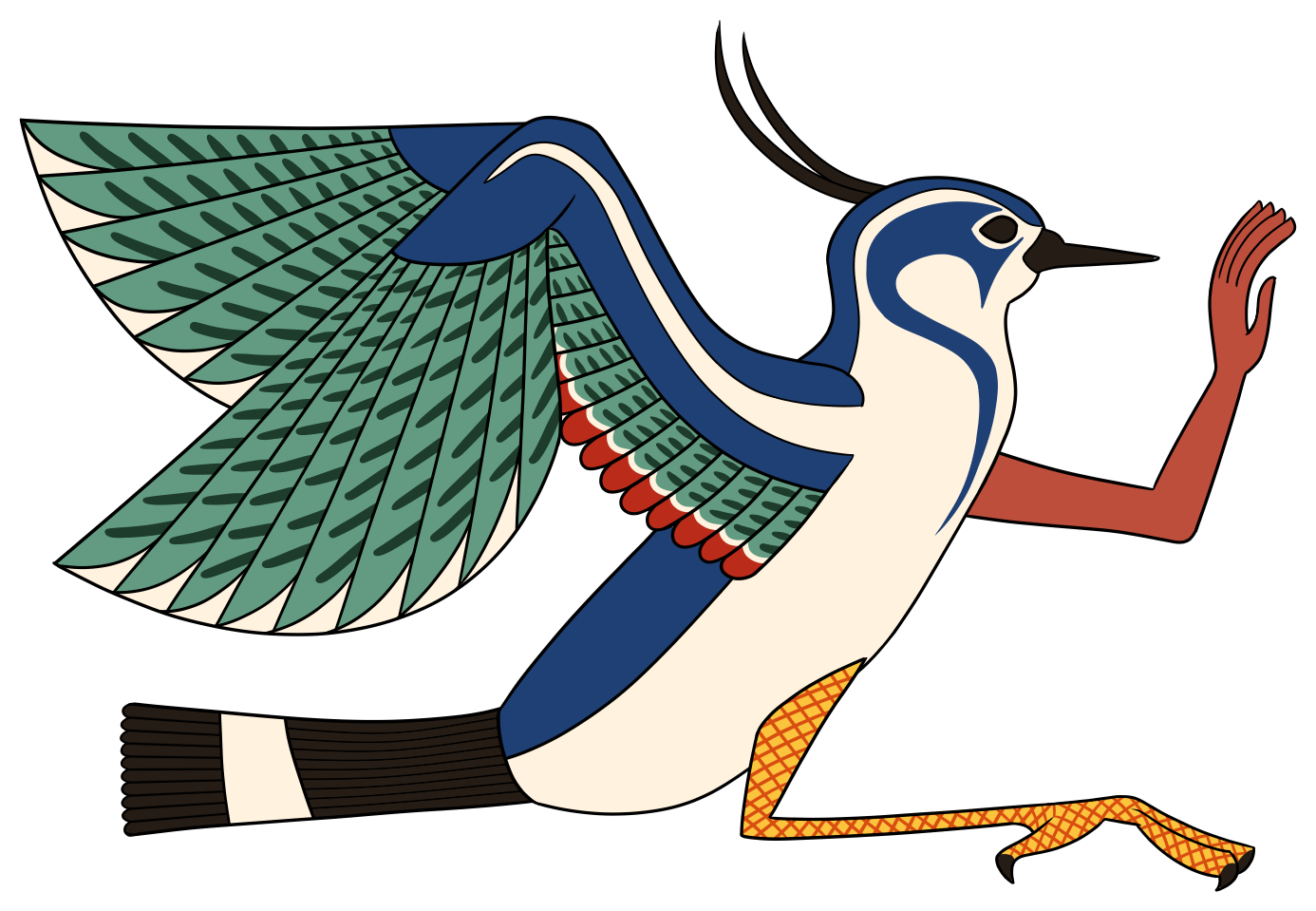
- drawing of Rekhyt
Name in hieroglyphs
D21 Aa1 M17 M17 X1 A1 Z2

With the decline of the Old Kingdom and the beginning of the Middle Kingdom, the position of the king changed. While in earlier times he stood "above the people", after the First Intermediate Period he was a "king among the people". He now had the role of a "shepherd of his people", as a guarantor of security who protected his "flock" and the Maat. In this respect, the king held a “command-receiving position” vis-à-vis Amun-Ra or Ra, which symbolically corresponded to the previous Rekhyt mythology.

A similar change took place in regarding the gods. In the Old Kingdom, a topography of the afterlife was irrelevant for non-royal deceased, since only the king could ascend into heaven. With the beginning of the Middle Kingdom, more precise ideas of the afterlife emerged, which were now also accessible to non-royal people. For the accompaniment of the dead and the worship of heavenly deities, new protective and auxiliary gods were necessary, to whom logistical and ritual tasks were assigned. The Rekhyt deity had a cult-accompanying function and in this network mainly took on the "god and king worshiping" position that was derived from the task previously assigned to the Rekhyt people as subjects and servants of the king.

=== Mythology ===
Since the lapwing belong to the migratory birds that overwintered in Lower Egypt (Qebehu), a connection was made between the appearance of the Ba birds and the birds from Qebehu. The mention of food has parallels to the Bas in the island of flames in the 56th scene of the Book of Gates, where herbs/vegetables (semu) are also given as food. The home of the lapwing was described as "coming from the distant (cooling) waters (of the sky)". A literal translation of the mythological terms used is not possible.

Already in the Old Kingdom, the region of "the (cooling) waters (of the sky)" was considered to be the area above the goddess Nut, behind which the primordial watery abyss of Nun begins. In this primordial darkness there are neither stars nor other celestial bodies, only the nothingness of "the primordial waters of Nu". According to ancient Egyptian beliefs, the sky itself was located on the body of the sky goddess Nut, who leaned over the earth in an arch supported on her fingertips and feet.

The deity Rekhyt has only been documented since the Middle Kingdom. The first mentions of the deity Pat date from around the same period. In a funerary text from the New Kingdom, the deceased proclaimed the words of the sun god Ra to Rekhyt. Rekhyt also appeared in other minor forms, such as the snake-headed 37th of the Assessors of Maat ("Wedj-Rekhyt"), who checked whether the deceased ever offended a deity in their life. Together with the deity Pat, Rekhyt worshiped the newborn god child Amun. It is also mentioned that Rekhyt and Pat "could not harm" the deceased.

In the Greco-Roman period, the feathers of Rekhyt were symbolically given as hair to the deceased, which saw the Rekhyt as a group who wore a "Peri bandage" on the neck, while the Pat people wore an Areq bandage on the head. As a triad of gods, Henmemet, Pat and Rekhyt were probably among the particularly revered deities in Edfu. Osiris appeared in the subsidiary form "Sau-Rechit (S3w-Rhjt)" as the protective deity of Rekhyt in the 18th Upper Egyptian Nome.

== Iconography ==
The deity Rekhyt first appeared as a group of three kneeling people in cheer who raised their arms. From the New Kingdom onwards, the deity Rekhyt appeared as a community of up to six leaping, each with raised human-shaped arms sitting on a nest worshiping other deities.

=== Hatshepsut ===
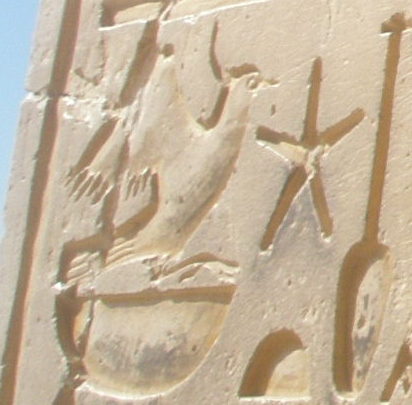
Rekhyt in the Mortuary Temple of Hatshepsut

The oldest surviving representations of the divine Rekhyt symbol are in the Mortuary Temple of Hatshepsut. In the entrance hall of her Red Chapel, there is a narrow decorative strip stretching across the entire north wall with symbols of the Rekhyt who, among other things, worship Hatshepsut as "praising their mistress" and in the same posture in the direction of the sanctuary, worship Amun-Re. This has various interpretations in Egyptology. On the one hand, the Rekhyt are here partly as a symbol of all the Egyptian people, but on the other hand their location on the north wall supports the traditional interpretation as "subjugated inhabitants of Lower Egypt" if the Pat are depicted on the south wall.

The Rekhyt hymn to Amun, preserved on the north side of the east wall, was probably present on all the transverse walls of the entrance hall, as two surviving texts can also be found in the sanctuary on the north and south sides:

All life, all duration and all happiness, all health and all joy; all countries and foreign countries are at the feet of Amun, lord of the thrones of both countries, whom all Rechit praise, for they live (through him) for a million of millions (of years) for (all) eternity.

— Entrance hall east wall, north side, block 133 and sanctuary east wall, north side, block 262

=== Amenhotep II ===
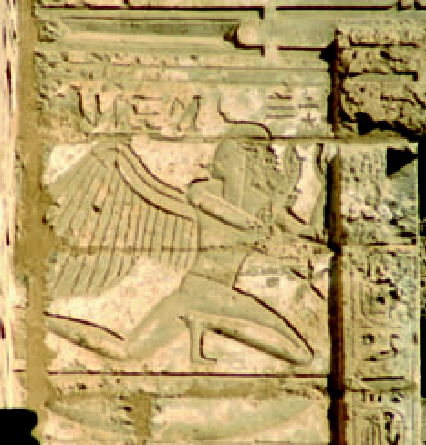
Ramesses III as a Rekhyt

In the forecourt of the Khnum temple in Elephantine, there is an inscription in which the Rekhyt are mentioned: “He (Amenophis II) built this temple for his father Khnum, who in Elephantine lives. The festival hall was built so that all Rekhyt people can see what he has done for Khnum.” The Rechit representations are also here, as is usually the case with the examined columned halls, not only in the entrance area but also in other inner rooms.

=== Ramesses III ===
In the Mortuary Temple of Ramesses III in Medinet Habu is the most conspicuous Rekhyt figure of all temples. On the upper outside of the wall of the Migdol entrance gate, Ramesses III is represented as Rekhyt in a praying posture; supplemented with the royal insignia of the Nemes headscarf and divine beard as well as the bull attribute.

=== Augustus ===
Augustus had a representation of Harpocrates in front of three kneeling Rekhyt people in the Mammisi of Philae:

Words to speak: Be silent four times and cheer four times, all Rekhyt people, let us come cheering so that you may see the son of Osiris (Harpocrates), who is your Lord and your Prince.

— Mammisi in Philae
