= Djed =

Ancient Egyptian symbol of stability

The djed, an ancient Egyptian symbol meaning 'stability', is the symbolic backbone of the god Osiris.

The djed, also djt (Ancient Egyptian: ḏd 𓊽, Coptic ϫⲱⲧ jōt "pillar", anglicized /dʒɛd/) is one of the more ancient and commonly found symbols in ancient Egyptian religion. It is a pillar-like symbol in Egyptian hieroglyphs representing stability. It is associated with the creator god Ptah and Osiris, the Egyptian god of the afterlife, the underworld, and the dead. It is commonly understood to represent his spine.

== Myth ==
In the Osiris myth, Osiris was killed by Set by being tricked into a coffin made to fit Osiris exactly. Set then had the coffin with the now deceased Osiris flung into the Nile. The coffin was carried by the Nile to the ocean and on to the city of Byblos in Lebanon. It ran aground and a sacred tree took root and rapidly grew around the coffin, enclosing the coffin within its trunk. The king of the land, intrigued by the tree's quick growth, ordered the tree cut down and installed as a pillar in his palace, unaware that the tree contained Osiris's body.

Meanwhile, Isis searched for Osiris aided by Anubis, and discovered Osiris's location in Byblos. Isis maneuvered herself into the favor of the king and queen and was granted a boon. She asked for the pillar in the palace hall, and upon being granted it, extracted the coffin from the pillar. She then consecrated the pillar, anointing it with myrrh and wrapping it in linen. This pillar came to be known as the pillar of djed.

== Origin and development ==
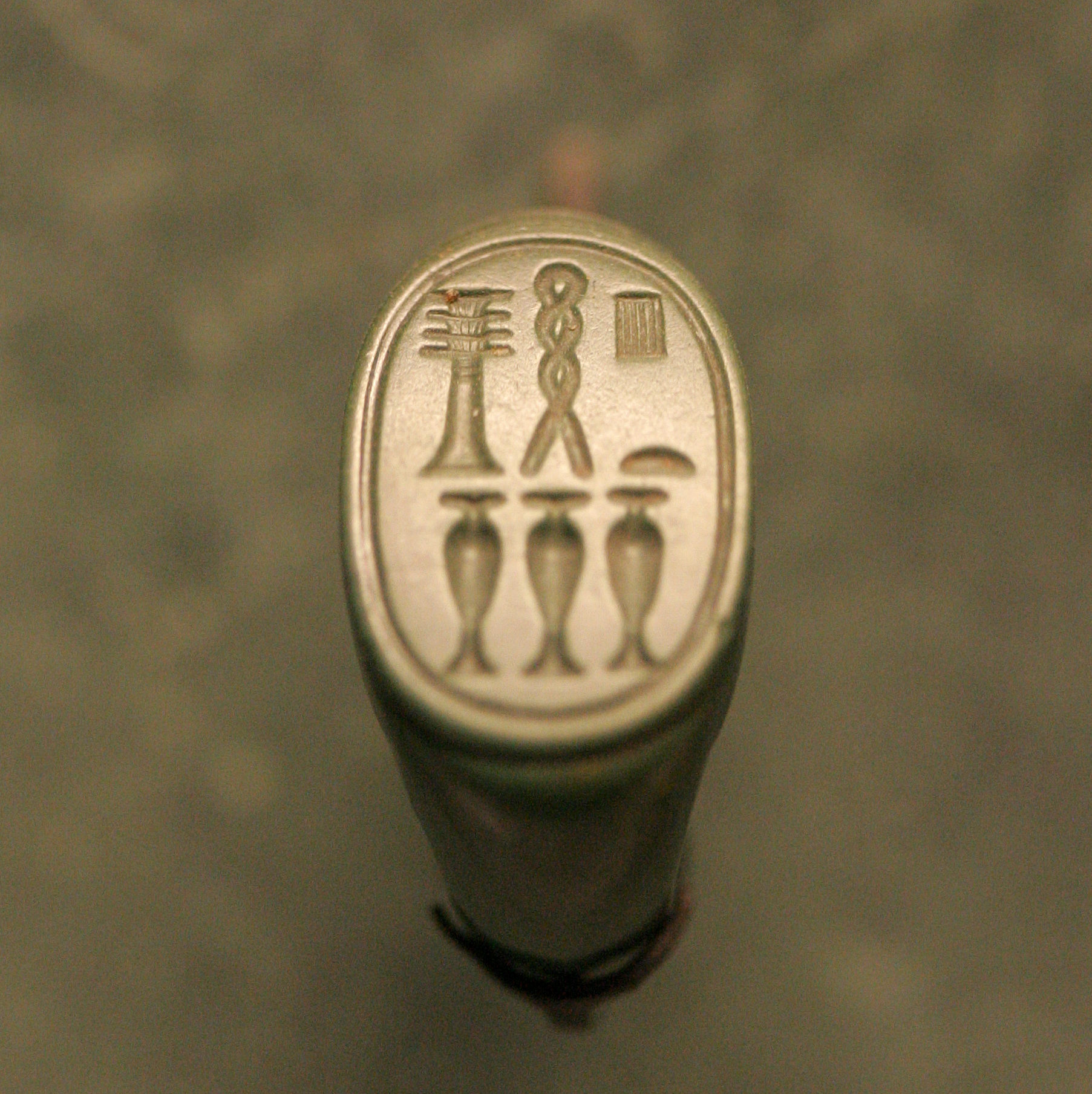
Seal ring featuring the inscription ptḥ ḏd ḥzwt "Ptah, the one with durable favors" Hieroglyphs (read from right, top): [the creator god] Ptah (ptḥ) [gives] enduring (djed) favors (i.e. libation offerings, expressed with the biliteral ḥz depicted triply for plural).

The djed may originally have been a fertility cult-related pillar made from reeds or sheaves or a totem from which sheaves of grain were suspended or grain was piled around. Erich Neumann remarks that the djed pillar is a tree fetish, which is significant considering that Egypt was primarily treeless. He indicates that the myth may represent the importance of the importation of trees by Egypt from Syria. The djed came to be associated with Seker, the falcon god of the Memphite Necropolis, then with Ptah, the Memphite patron god of craftsmen. Ptah was often referred to as "the noble djed", and carried a scepter that was a combination of the djed symbol and the ankh, the symbol of life. Ptah gradually came to be assimilated into Osiris. By the time of the New Kingdom, the djed was firmly associated with Osiris.

In their 2004 book The Quick and the Dead: Biomedical Theory in Ancient Egypt, Andrew Hunt Gordon and Calvin W. Schwabe speculated that the ankh, djed, and was symbols have a biological basis derived from ancient cattle culture (linked to the Egyptian belief that semen was created in the spine), thus:

- the ankh, symbol of life, thoracic vertebra of a bull (seen in cross section)
- the djed, symbol of stability, based on sacrum of a bull's spine
- the was-sceptre, symbol of power and dominion, a staff featuring the head and tail of the god Set, "great of strength"

== Hieroglyphic usage ==
R11
ḏd
in hieroglyphs

Gardiner: R11

The djed hieroglyph was a pillar-like symbol that represented stability. It was also sometimes used to represent Osiris himself, often combined "with a pair of eyes between the crossbars and holding the crook and flail." The djed hieroglyph is often found together with the tyet (also known as Isis knot) hieroglyph, which is translated as life or welfare. The djed and the tyet used together may depict the duality of life. The tyet hieroglyph may have become associated with Isis because of its frequent pairing with the djed.

== Ceremonial usage ==
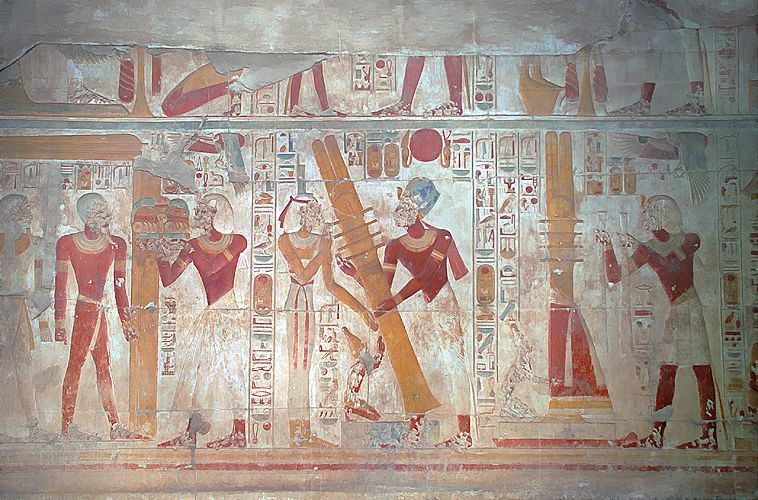
A scene on the west wall of the Osiris Hall at Abydos shows the raising of the Djed pillar.

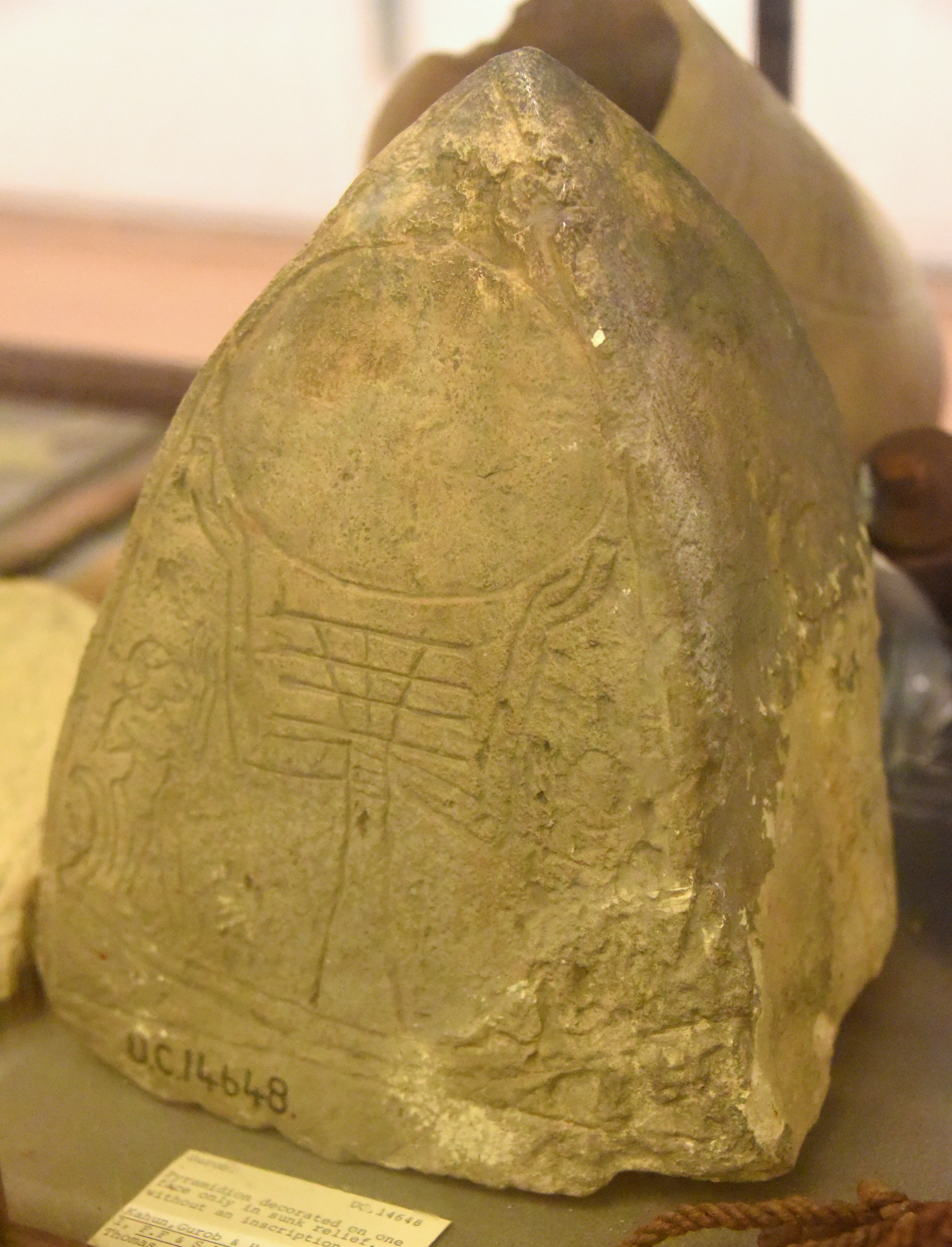
Limestone pyramidion. Curved sides, no hieroglyphic inscriptions. Relief showing arms of djed holding sun disc. Two adoring baboons. From Gurob, Faiyum. Dynasty XIX. Petrie Museum of Egyptian Archaeology, London

The djed was an important part of the ceremony called "raising the djed", which was a part of the celebrations of the Sed festival, the Egyptian jubilee celebration. The act of raising the djed has been explained as representing Osiris's triumph over Seth. Ceremonies in Memphis are described where the pharaoh, with the help of the priests, raised a wooden djed column using ropes. The ceremony took place during the period when fields were sown and the year's agricultural season would begin, corresponding to the month of Koiak, the fourth month of the Season of the Inundation. This ceremony was a part of one of the more popular holidays and celebrations of the time, a larger festival dedicated to Osiris conducted from the 13th to 30th day of the Koiak. Celebrated as it was at that time of the year when the soil and climate were most suitable for agriculture, the festival and its ceremonies can be seen as an appeal to Osiris, who was the God of vegetation, to favor the growth of the seeds sown, paralleling his own resurrection and renewal after his murder by Seth.

Further celebrations surrounding the raising of the djed are described in a relief in Amenhotep III's Luxor Temple. In the tomb in the temple, the scene shows the raising of the djed pillar taking place in the morning of Amenhotep III's third Sed festival, which took place in his thirty-seventh regnal year. The scene is described by Sigrid Hodel-Hoenes:

The anthropomorphized pillar stands at the middle left, in a shrine. It has taken the shape of a human body with the djed-pillar as its head; the eyes are udjat-eyes. The hands hold the crook and flail, the usual insignia of Osiris, the god of the dead. On its head is the tall feather crown with the solar disk. The pillar is on a high base reminiscent of the platforms visible today in many temples, on which the cult barks once stood. In front of and behind it are lotus and papyrus blossoms. Beneath the large slab of the base are two tall offering stands – one bears a libation vessel, while flowers have been laid on the other. To the right is the king himself, presenting a generously laid table. Fowl, cucumbers, blossoms, breads, and heads and ribs of beef are all lying on the upper mat, while a cow and an antelope can be seen on the lower one. Beneath these mats are four tall vessels containing unguents and oil, with bundles of lettuce sticking out among them. The vulture goddess, Wadjyt, the Mistress of the Per-nu shrine, has spread her protective wings above the sovereign, with the blue crown on his head.

— Sigrid Hodel-Hoenes, Life and death in ancient Egypt : scenes from private tombs in new kingdom Thebes, p. 222

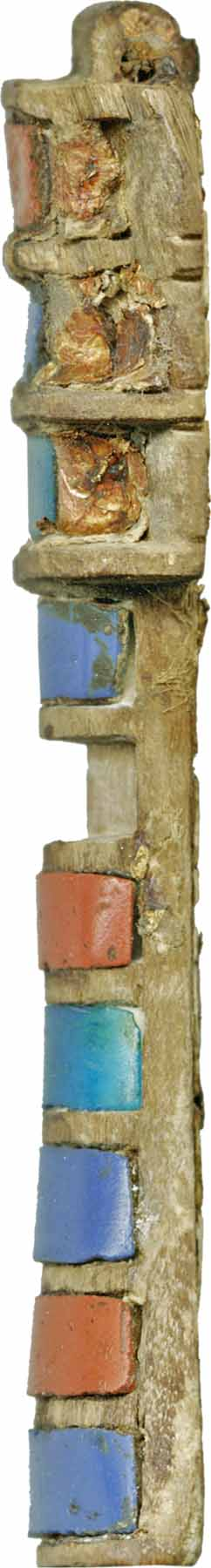
Djed constructed of gilded inlay on wood with red, blue, and green glass. Walters Art Museum.

There is also a scene depicted in the tomb to the right of the above scene which has not been well preserved. Hodel-Hoenes explains that it once showed the pharaoh, accompanied by his queen, using a rope to raise the djed pillar. Three men, probably priests of the temple of Memphis, help him in the process. A fourth priest was seen supporting the pillar. Various offerings were presented before the pillar below the ropes. The pharaoh and his queen are each accompanied by four pairs of young women resembling those of the sed-festival. Each of these women is rattling a Hathor sistrum, a musical instrument for percussion with a U-shaped handle and frame seen as resembling the face and horns of the cow goddess Hathor, while holding a menat, a protective amulet associated with Hathor, in the other hand. A line of hieroglyphs running just above the girls' heads in each row of women says, "Children of the king praising (or charming) the noble djed pillar." Hodel-Hoenes interprets this as identifying the girls as the daughters of Amenhotep III.

There are three additional reliefs below these two reliefs. They depict further ceremonies that accompany the erection of the djed pillar, especially games and dances. In one, food-bearers carrying edibles weave between men dancing with heavy steps. A line of singers on the far left seems to sing a short hymn to Ptah, the text of which is written alongside the line. Singing and dancing girls can be seen in the next relief, though Hodel-Hoenes comments on their seeming lack of grace, saying, "only the raised hands and the foot swinging in the air hint at the movements of a dance." The relief also depicts men involved in a boxing match and a stick dance, sports and dances which can still be seen in Egypt today.

The festival of the raising of the djed also involved reenactments conducted at Denderah, Edfu, Busiris, Memphis, and Philae. But the most elaborate and grand celebration occurred at Abydos, the cult center of Osiris. From around the end of the third millennium BC during the beginning of the Dynasty XII and perhaps as early as the Dynasty VI three hundred years earlier, reenactments of the Osiris myth – the deception and murder of Osiris by Seth, the search for Osiris by Isis and Osiris' mummification, funeral and his resurrection were performed. From the late fourth century BC, a recitation of the Lamentations of Isis and Nephthys, a poem describing Isis and Nephthys' search for Osiris, was added to the ceremony on the 25th day of Koiak. At the Osiris Temple in Abydos, these re-enactments are described as involving hundreds of priests and priestesses in the roles of the gods and goddesses, with 34 reed boats carrying the gods, a sculpture of Osiris inside an elaborate chest, 365 ornamental lamps, incense, and dozens of djed amulets.

== Usage as amulets ==
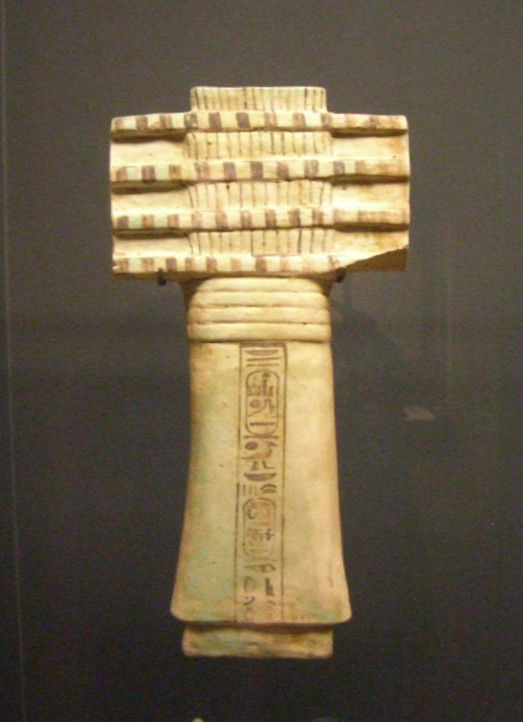
A djed amulet with the name of Ramesses IX of the Twentieth Dynasty inscribed upon it.

The djed was often used as amulets for the living and the dead. It was placed as an amulet near the spines of mummified bodies, which was supposed to ensure the resurrection of the dead, allowing the deceased to live eternally. The Book of the Dead lists a spell which, when spoken over a gold amulet hung around the mummy's neck, ensures that the mummy would regain use of its spine and be able to sit up. It was also painted onto coffins.

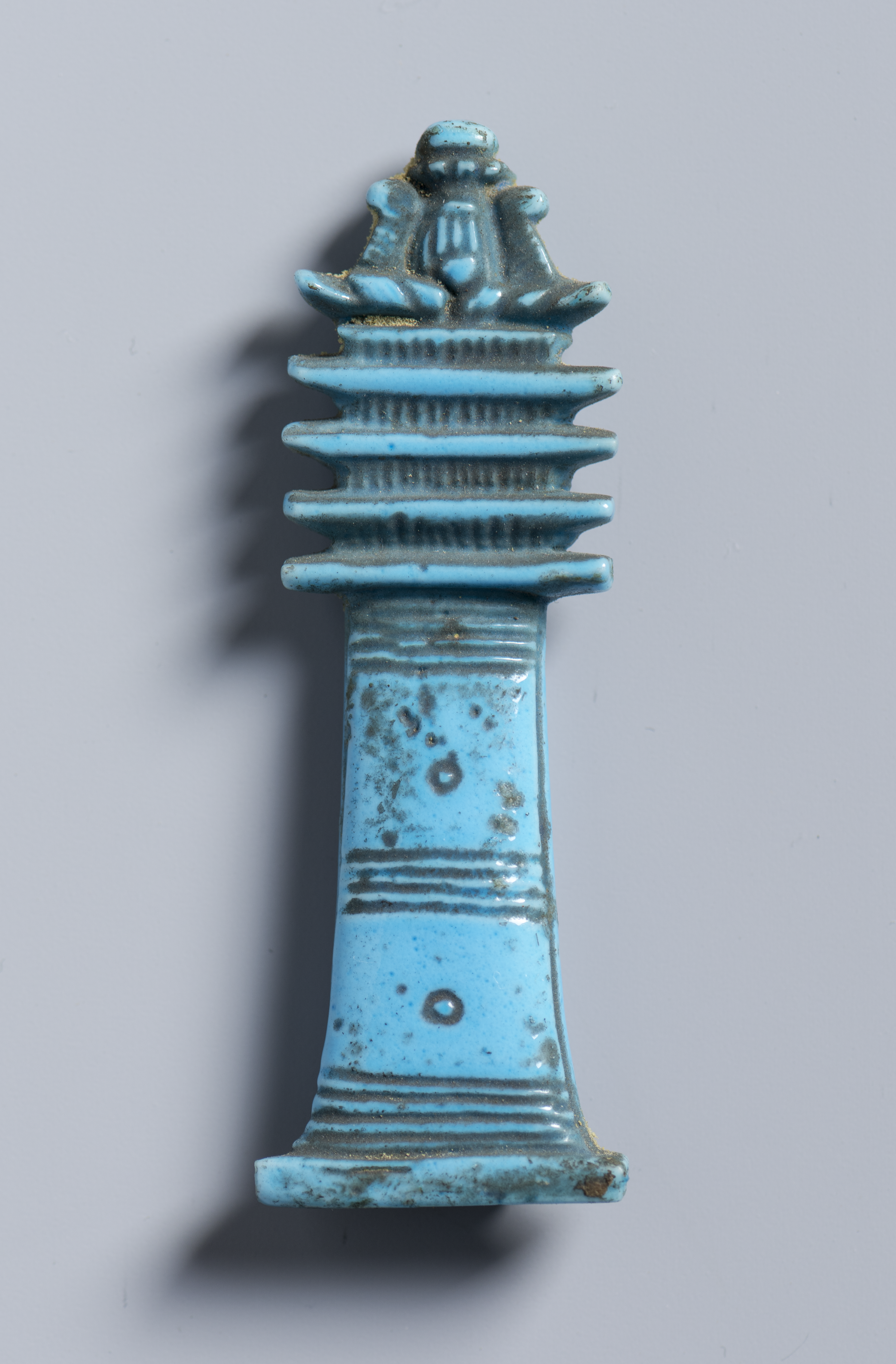
Amulet depicting the djed pillar, Egyptian faience, between 722 and 332 BC. Late Period. Museo Egizio, Turin.

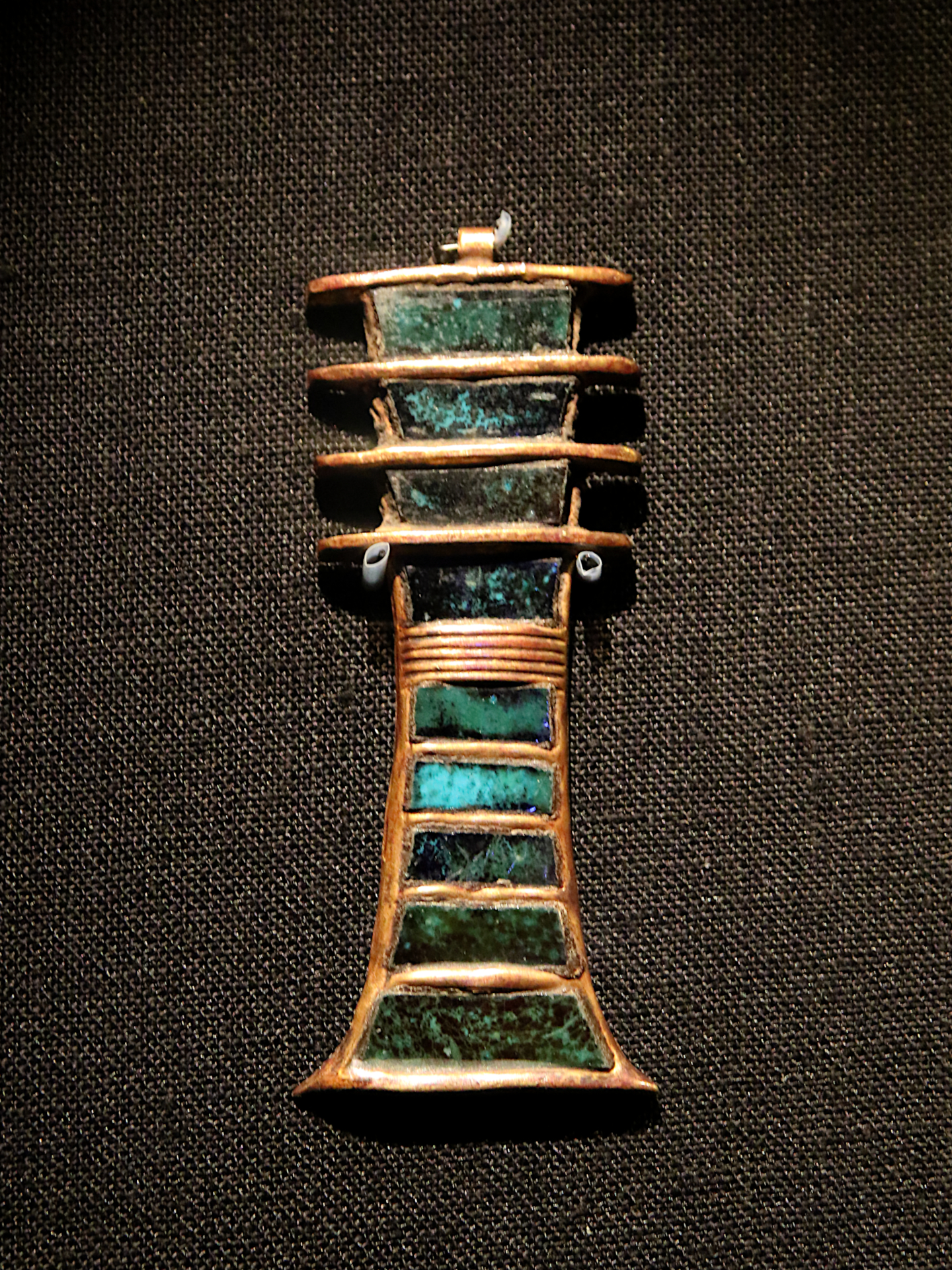
A Djed Pillar shaped amulet jewellery from Tutankhamun's tomb

== Parallels in other cultures ==
Parallels have also been drawn between the djed pillar and various items in other cultures. Sidney Smith in 1922, first suggested a parallel with the Assyrian "sacred tree" when he drew attention to the presence of the upper four bands of the djed pillar and the bands that are present in the center of the vertical portion of the tree. He also proposed a common origin between Osiris and the Assyrian god Assur with whom he said, the sacred tree might be associated. Cohen and Kangas suggest that the tree is probably associated with the Sumerian god of male fertility, Enki and that for both Osiris and Enki, an erect pole or polelike symbol stands beneath a celestial symbol. They also point out that the Assyrian king is depicted in proximity to the sacred tree, which is similar to the depiction of the pharaoh in the raising of the djed ceremony. Additionally, the sacred tree and the Assyrian winged disk, which are generally depicted separately, are combined in certain designs, similar to the djed pillar which is sometimes surmounted with a solar disk. Katherine Harper and Robert Brown also discuss a possible strong link between the djed column and the concept of kundalini in yoga.

== Photo galleries ==
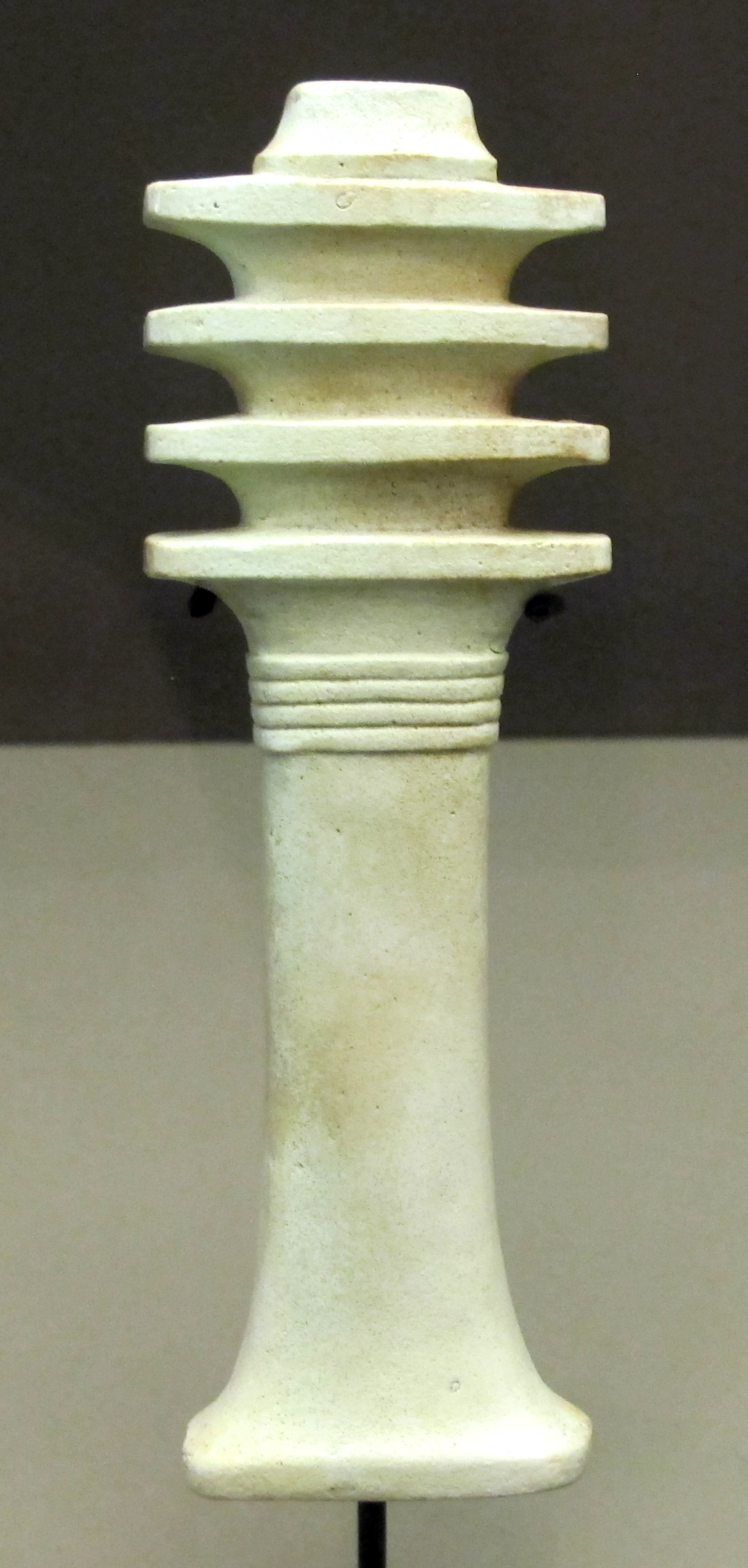
Djed-shaped amulet

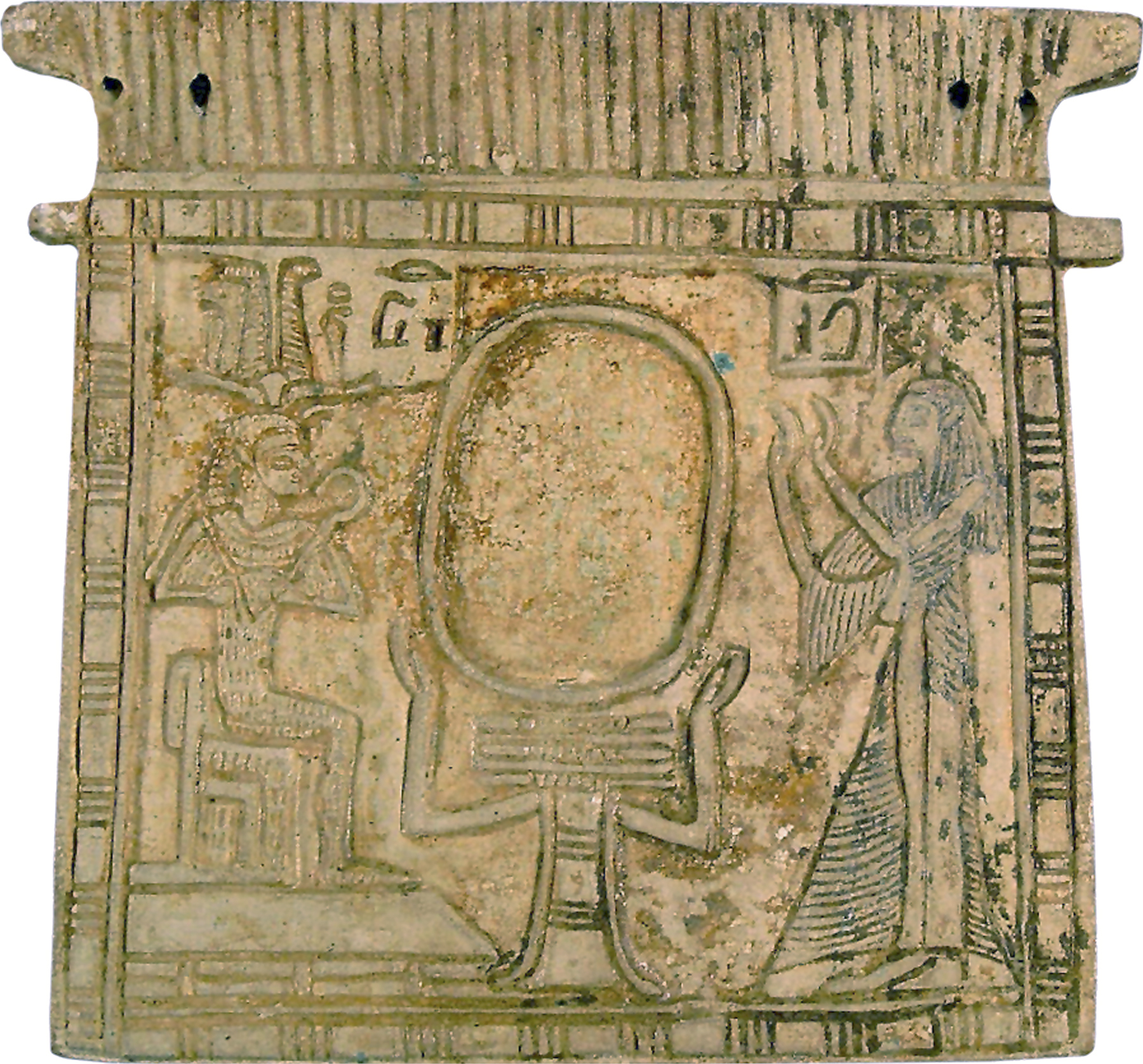
Anthropomorphic example

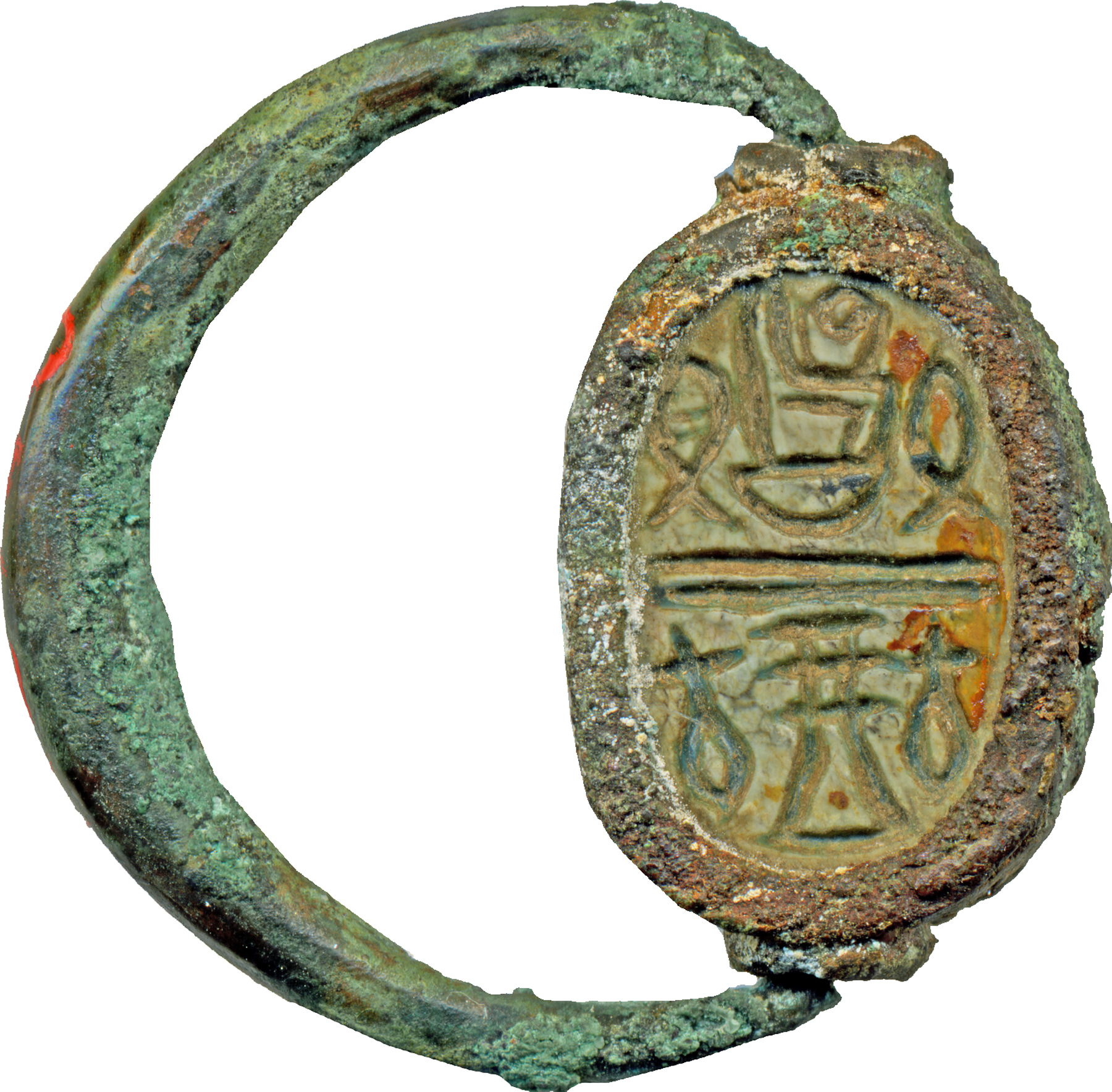
Scarab Ring featuring the Djed symbol in the seal

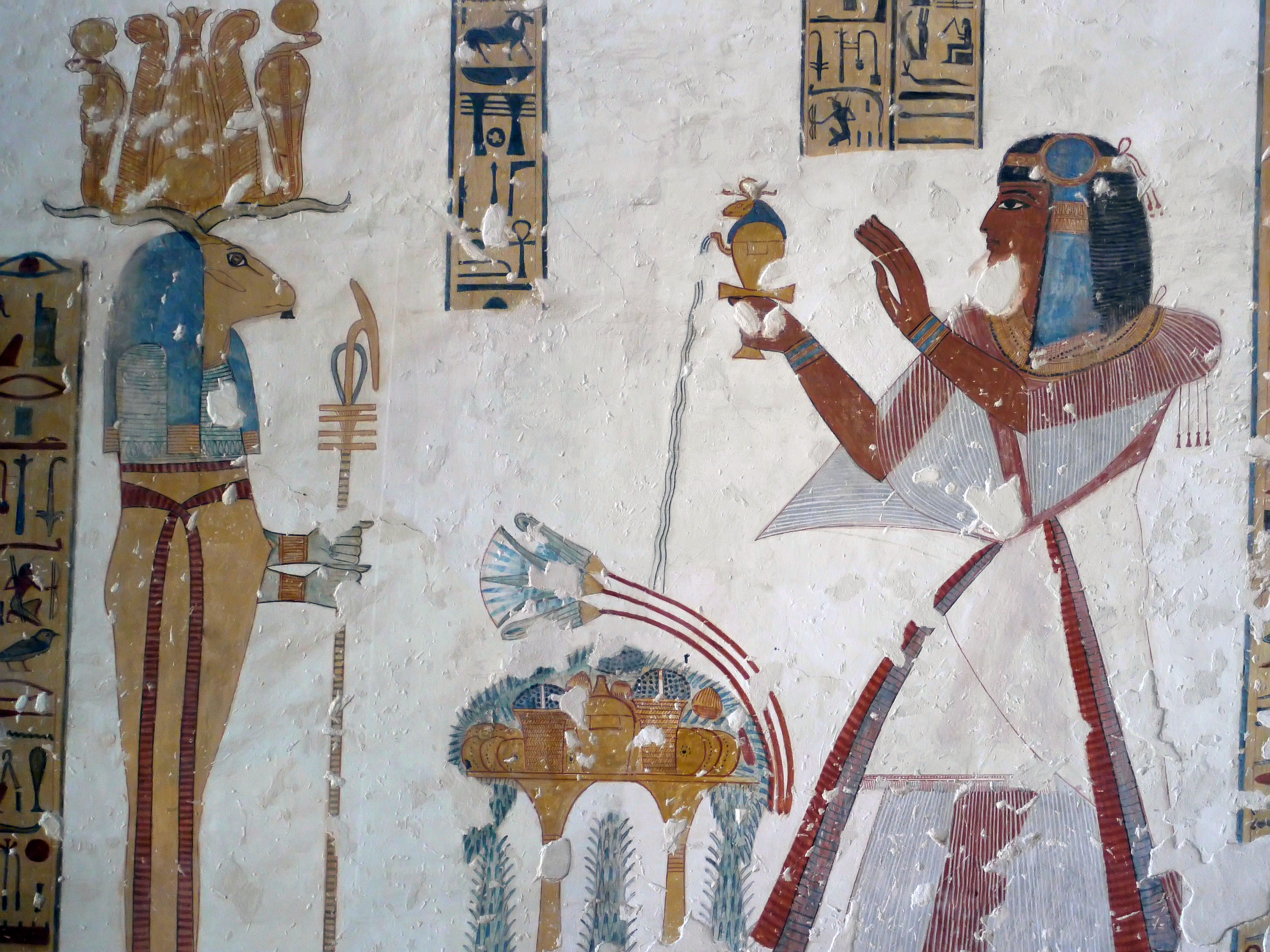
Example in staff & hieroglyphs

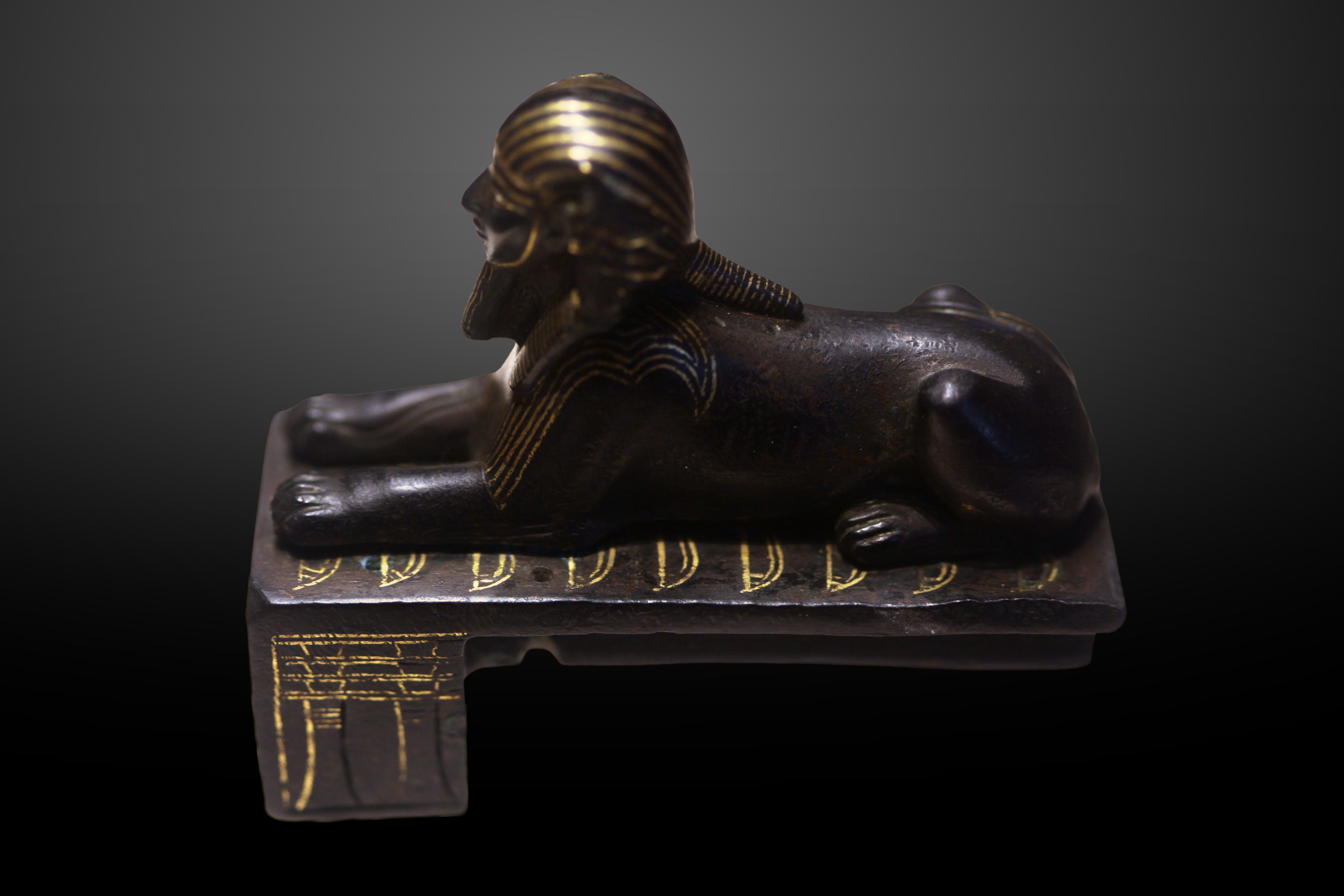
The Bronze Sphinx of Thutmose III reclining over the Nine Bows; the Djed pillars of Dominion are featured on the side of the socle

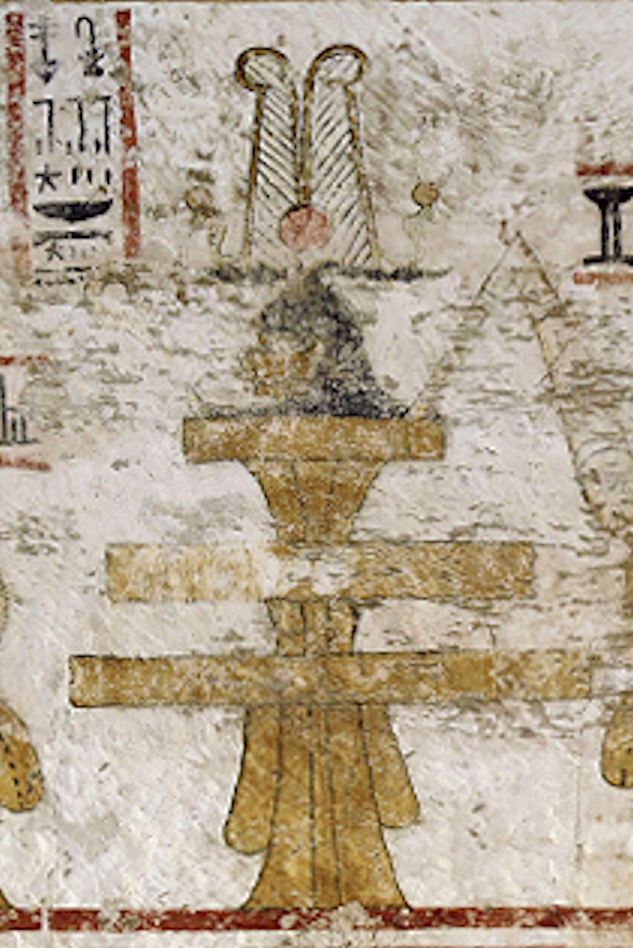
Bir el-Shaghala Tomb 1, djed-pillar topped by a human head, for the veneration of Osiris

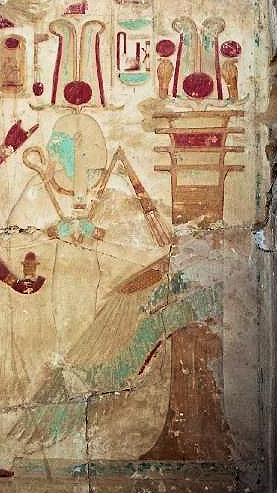
Winged djed pillar behind Osiris (Temple of Ramses II at Abydos)

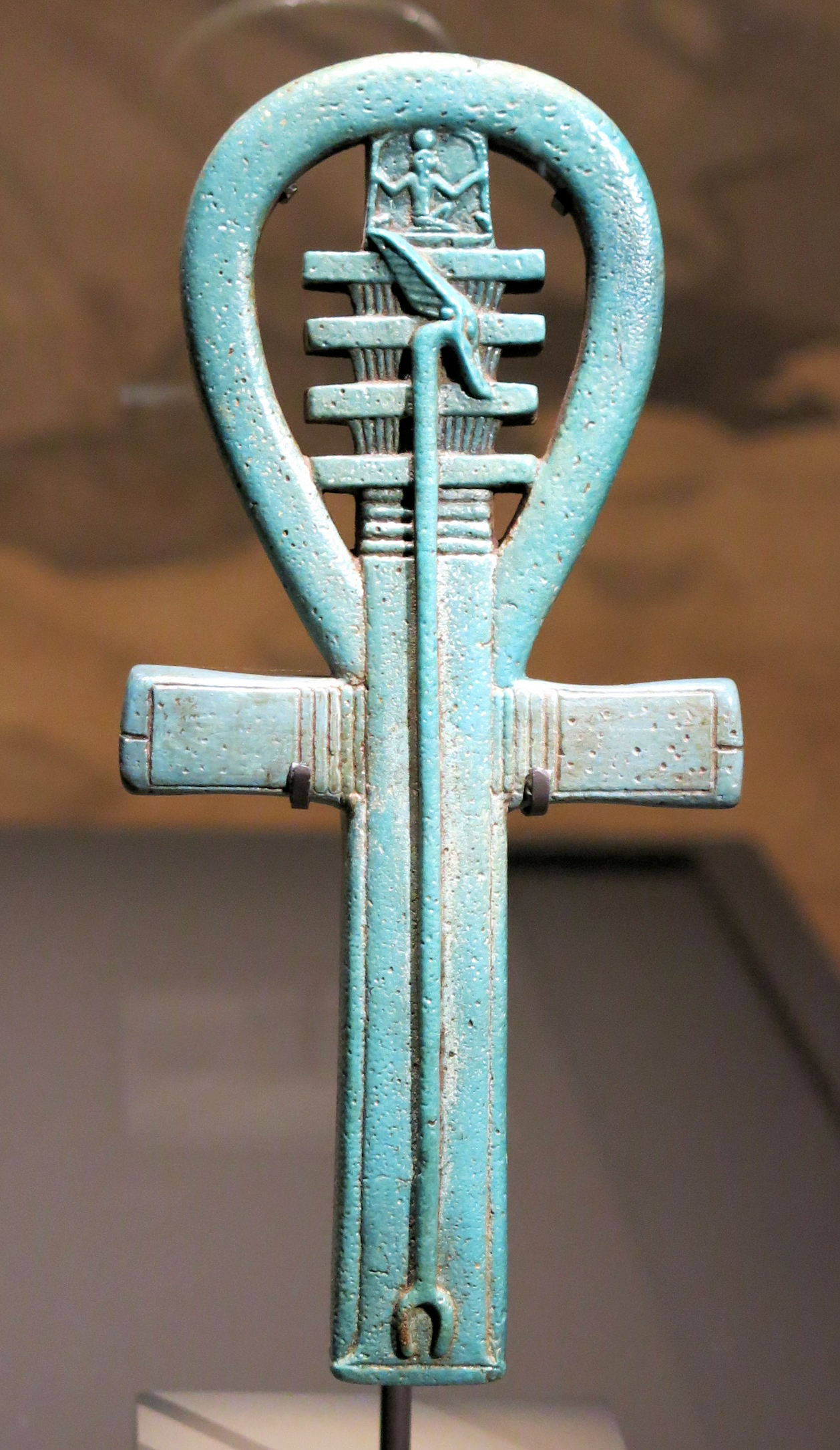
Djed amulet, Gebel Barkal, 25th Dynasty. Ânkh-Djed-Ouas (British Museum, EA 54412)

Modern drawing of an anthropomorphic Djed

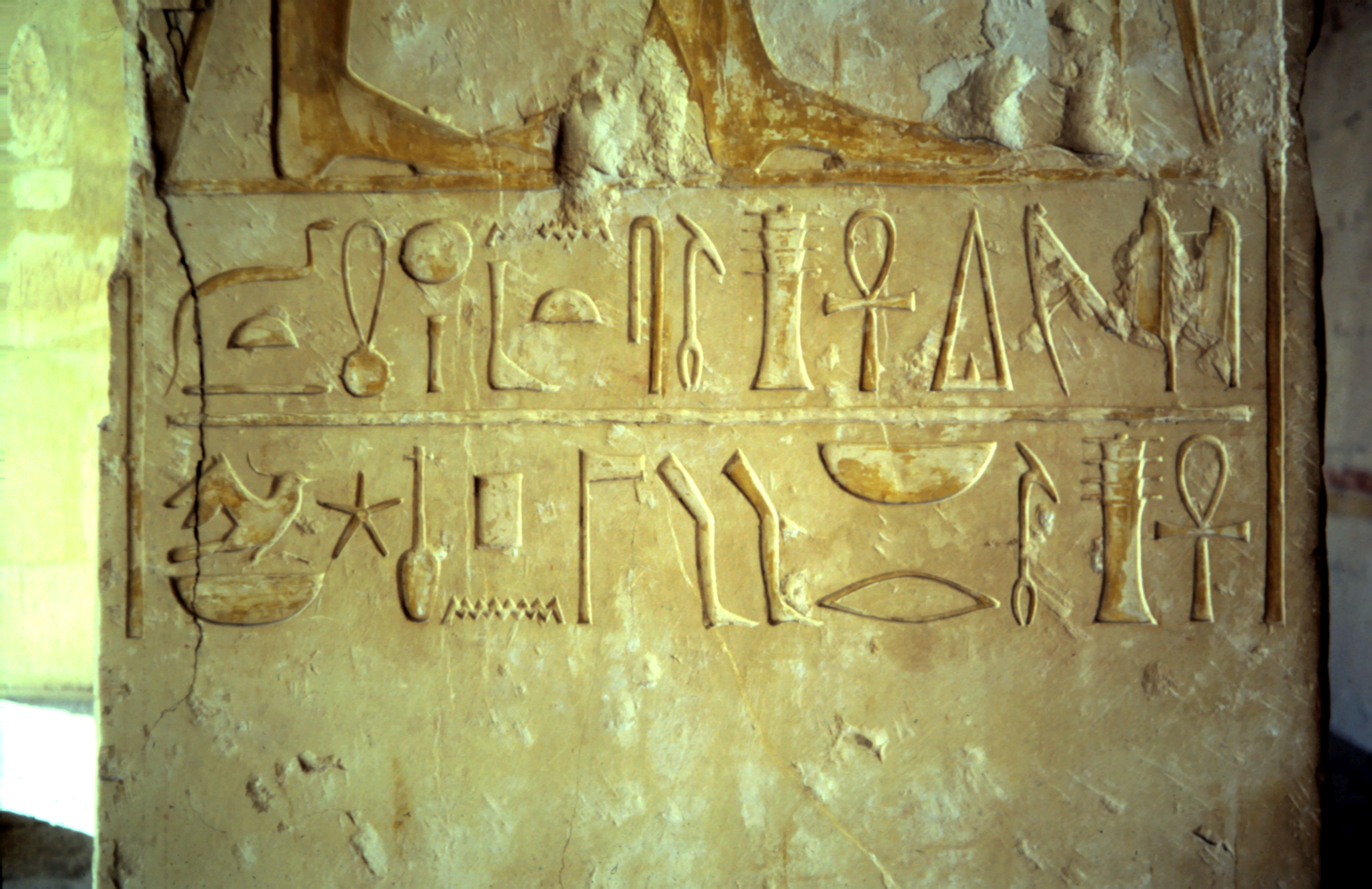
Inscription at Deir el-Bahari featuring djed

== See also ==
- Dendera light, an inscription including a djed pillar, sometimes claimed to show electric lighting
