= Nine bows =

Reference to the enemies of Ancient Egypt

Nine bows in hieroglyphs
T10 t Z2ss Z2ss Z2ss
psḏt pḏt pesedjet pedjet

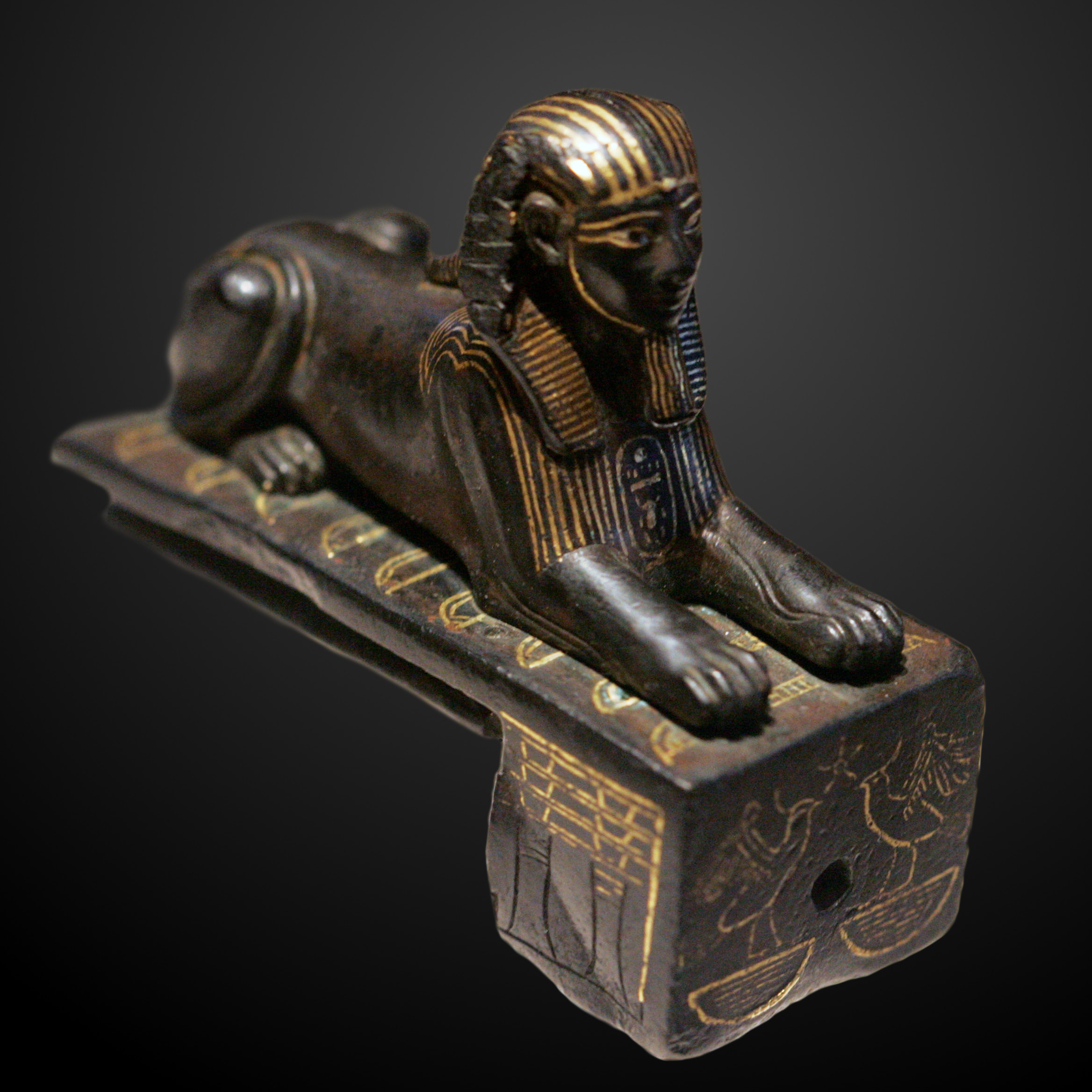
The Bronze Sphinx of Thutmose III, showing Pharaoh reclining on the Nine Bows. The front of the statuette uses the lapwing Rekhyt bird to say: "all the people give praise", using the hieroglyphs, nb, for all, the lapwing, for the people, and the star, for praising; (this is a rebus). Djed pillars of "Dominion" are on the side.

The Nine Bows is a visual representation in Ancient Egyptian art of foreigners or others. Besides the nine bows, there were no other generic representations of foreigners. Due to its ability to stand in for any nine enemies to Ancient Egypt, the peoples covered by this term changed over time as enemies changed, and there is no true list of the nine bows.

Alternatively, the nine bows may have had a separate or complementary meaning. In Egyptian hieroglyphs, the word 'Nine Bows' is spelled out as a bow and three sets of three vertical lines. The bow, holding the phonic value "pḏ," means "stretch, (be) wide," and the three sets of lines makes the word plural. The number nine was used metaphorically to express totality. Using this more literal translation of the hieroglyphs, the nine bows could also refer to endless, innumerable foreign lands or the totality of foreign lands.

Ancient Egyptians believed in dualism or that two cosmic forces, order and chaos, governed the universe. While the nine bows stood in for Ancient Egypt's enemies, it is also possible that they stood in for disorder as well.

== Symbolism in art ==
Instances of the nine bows appeared as early as the late predynastic period (3200-3000 BCE). Discovered in Hierakonpolis or Nekhen, here the nine bows were carved on the head of a scepter. As time progressed, the use of the nine bows expanded to other mediums of art.

When in statuette and statue form, it is typical for the nine bows to be displayed underneath feet. The iconography is similar to a biblical text such as Psalm 110:1 “… until I make your enemies your footstool,” meaning the nine bows placement underneath the feet of Pharaohs and other powerful figures, such as a sphinx, were meant to symbolize the enemy being trampled or entirely under control. One such example of the footstool comes from the tomb of Pharaoh-King Tutankhamun. Each time that King Tut stepped on the footstool, he would symbolically be trampling his enemies. Another example, can be seen on the insoles of Pharaoh's sandals. On the sandals, each shoe has eight bows laying horizontally in a vertical line with one another. Four of the bows are at the top of the sandal near the toe, while four are at the heel. Where the arch of the foot would be, there are two foreigners of Ancient Egypt depicted facing outward on each shoe. As with the footstool, whenever the sandals were worn, it would have been as if the enemies of Ancient Egypt were trampled.

== Pharaoh Djoser ==
One of the oldest representations of the nine bows, and the first representation of the nine bows fully developed, is on the seated statue of Pharaoh Djoser. His feet rest upon part of the nine bows, which may have referred to Nubians during his reign because of their use of bows and arrows.

== Pedestal of Ramses II ==
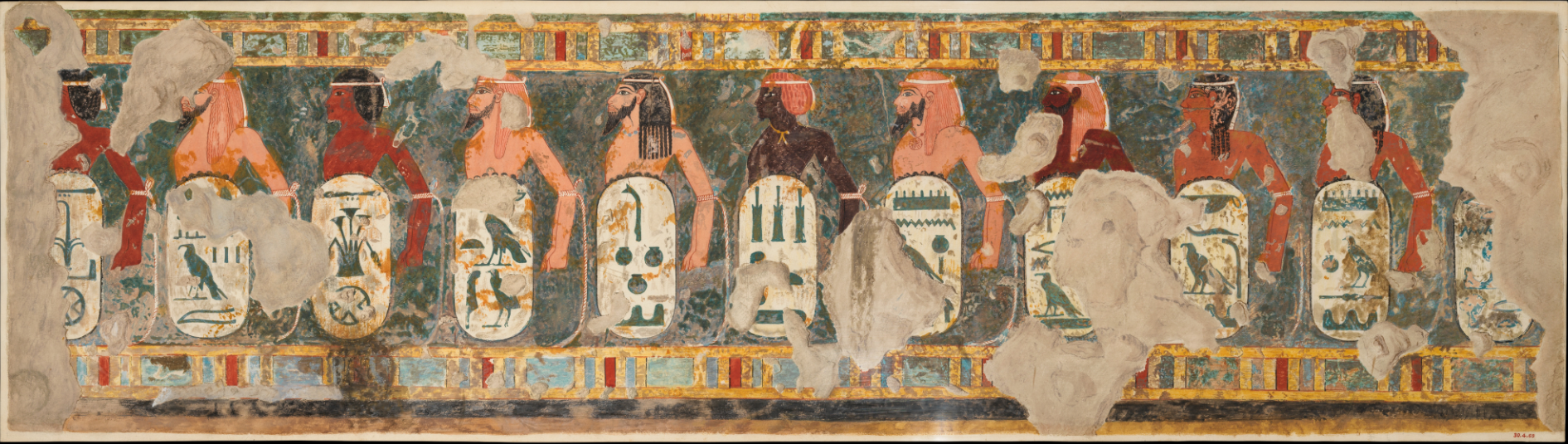
Tomb of Qenamun, foreign tribes and internal rebels left to right: *Ta-shemau (Upper Kemites) *Sekhtiu-iam (Siwa oasis dwellers) *Ta-mehu (Lower Kemites) *Pedjeti-shu (Eastern Desert bowmen) *Tjehenu (desert Libyans) *Iuntiu Seti (nomadic Nubians) *Mentiu nu setet (Asiatic bedouins) *Naharin (Mittani / Upper Mesopotamians) * Keftiu (Cretans / Minoans) *Manu (Uncertain: ?dwellers of the western desert frontier at Great Sand Sea? / ?Min cultists at Wadi Hammamat?) * Retenu (Syrians)

The pedestal of Ramses II was found in Antinoopolis, El-Minya, Egypt. It is rectangular in shape and made of Egyptian alabaster. The engravings found on three sides are carved using Bas-relief, which is indicative of the New Kingdom and Ramses II's reign. Along with the nine bows depicted on top of the pedestal underneath Ramses II's feet, the pedestal also includes engravings of Ramses II's cartouche along with his Horus name and legends of Ramses II's rule. Attached to one of them are oval rings which name the nine nations or tribes which represent Egypt's enemies or tribes it considers foreign, which are namely:

1. Hau-nebut, the Aegean Sea islanders
2. Shat, people of third Nile cataract in Tombos (Nubia), Sudan
3. Ta-Shemau, Upper Egyptians; internal rebels
4. Sekhtiu-iam, people of the Siwa Oasis
5. Ta-mehu, Nile delta; internal rebels
6. Pedetiu-shu, Arabian Desert people
7. Tehenu, Libyan people
8. Iuntiu-Seti, residents of Nubia, primarily in northeastern Sudan
9. Mentiu-nu-Setet, the Asiatic groups

== Gallery of Images ==
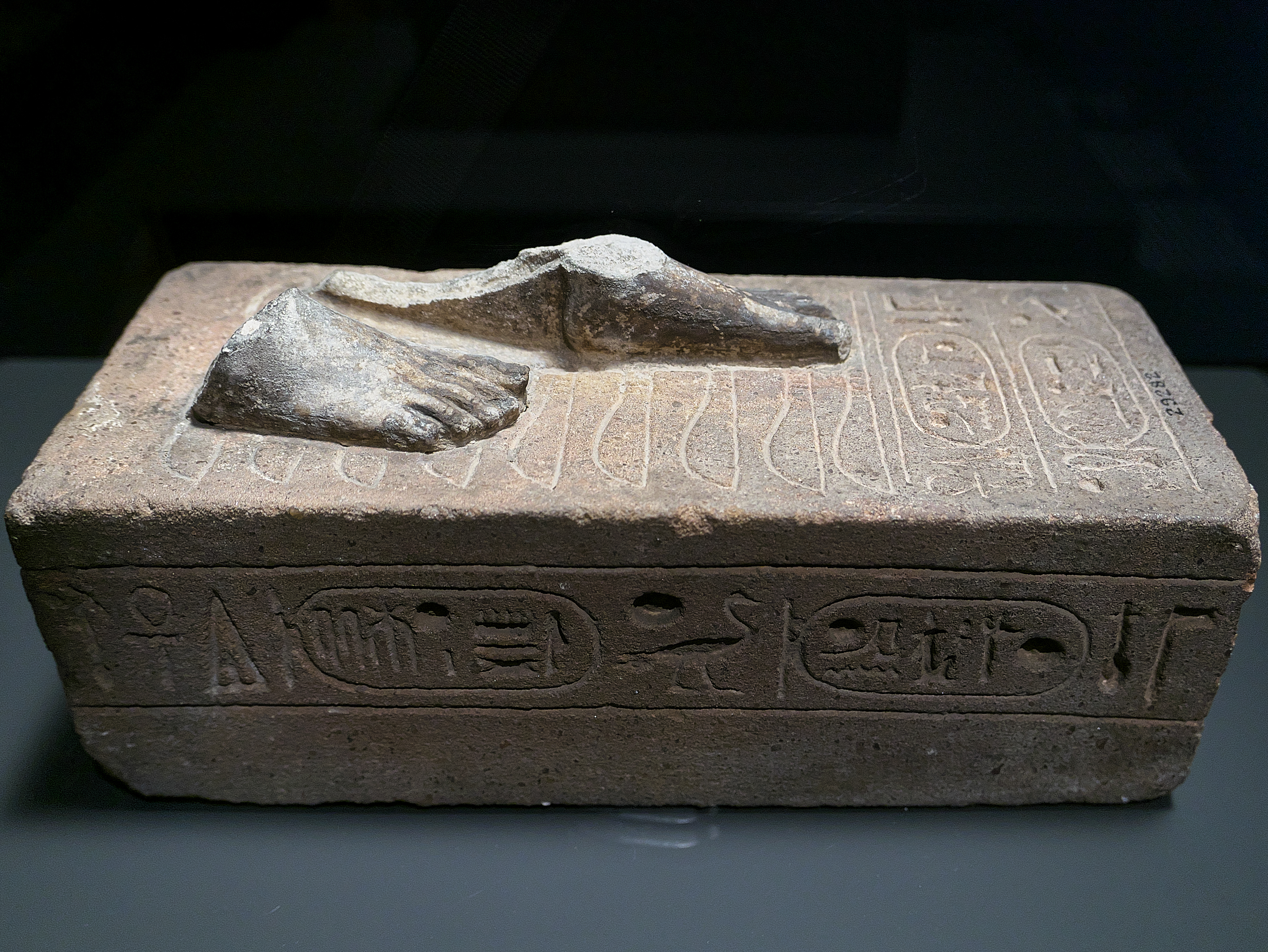
Alabaster pedestal of Ramses II found in Antinoopolis. Ramses II's feet can be seen on top on the nine bows.

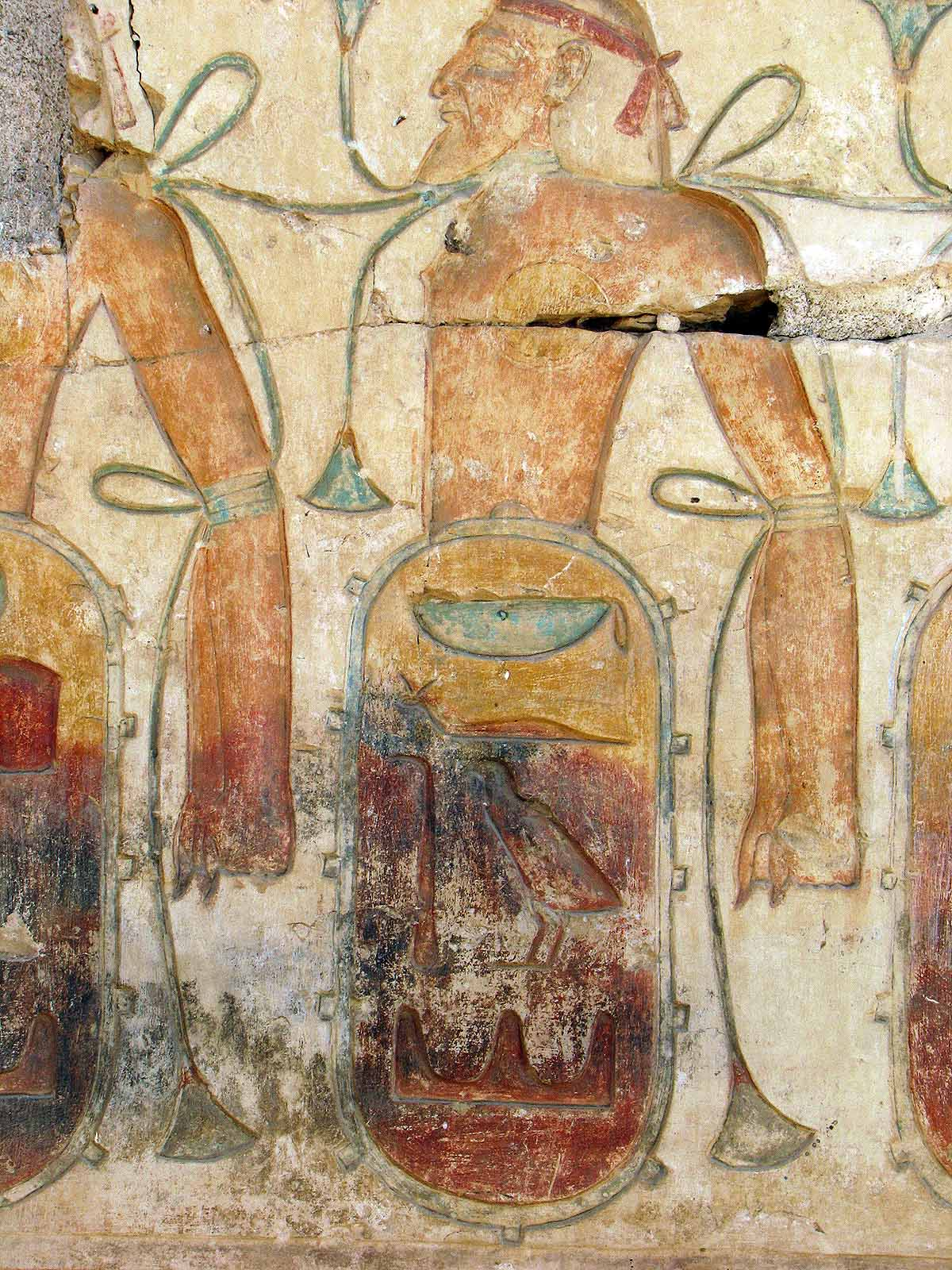
A depiction of a tied up Keftiu from Ramesses II's temple at Abydos

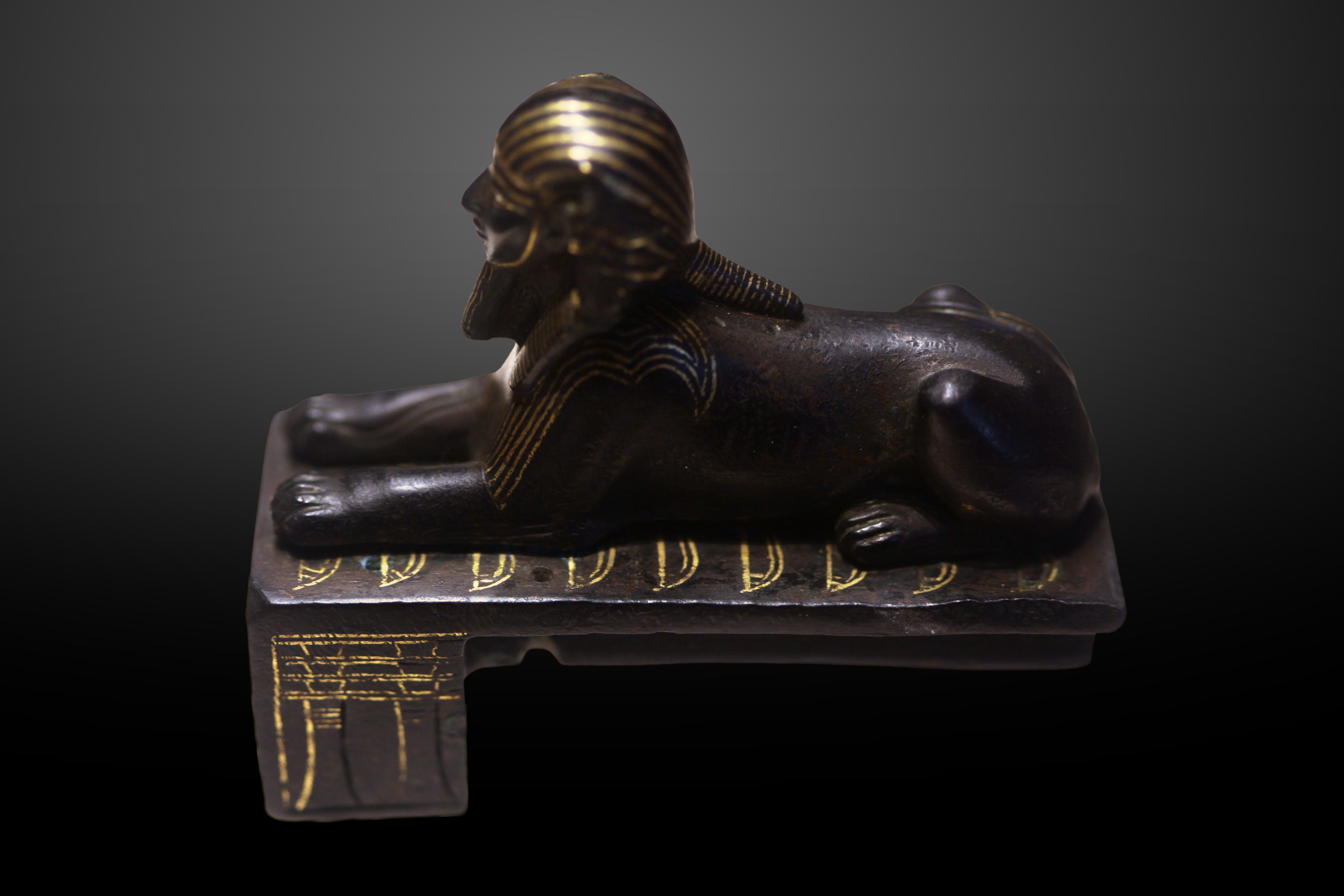
The Bronze Sphinx of Thutmose III, depicting a sphinx reclining over the Nine Bows

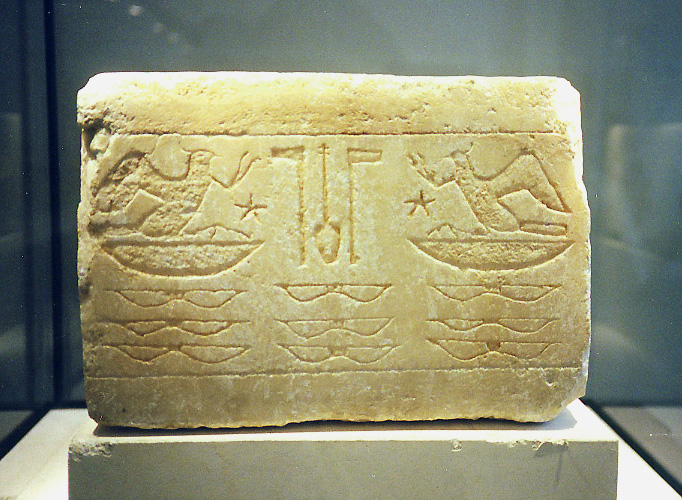
Statue pedestal of Nectanebo II, the Nine Bows carved on the lower half

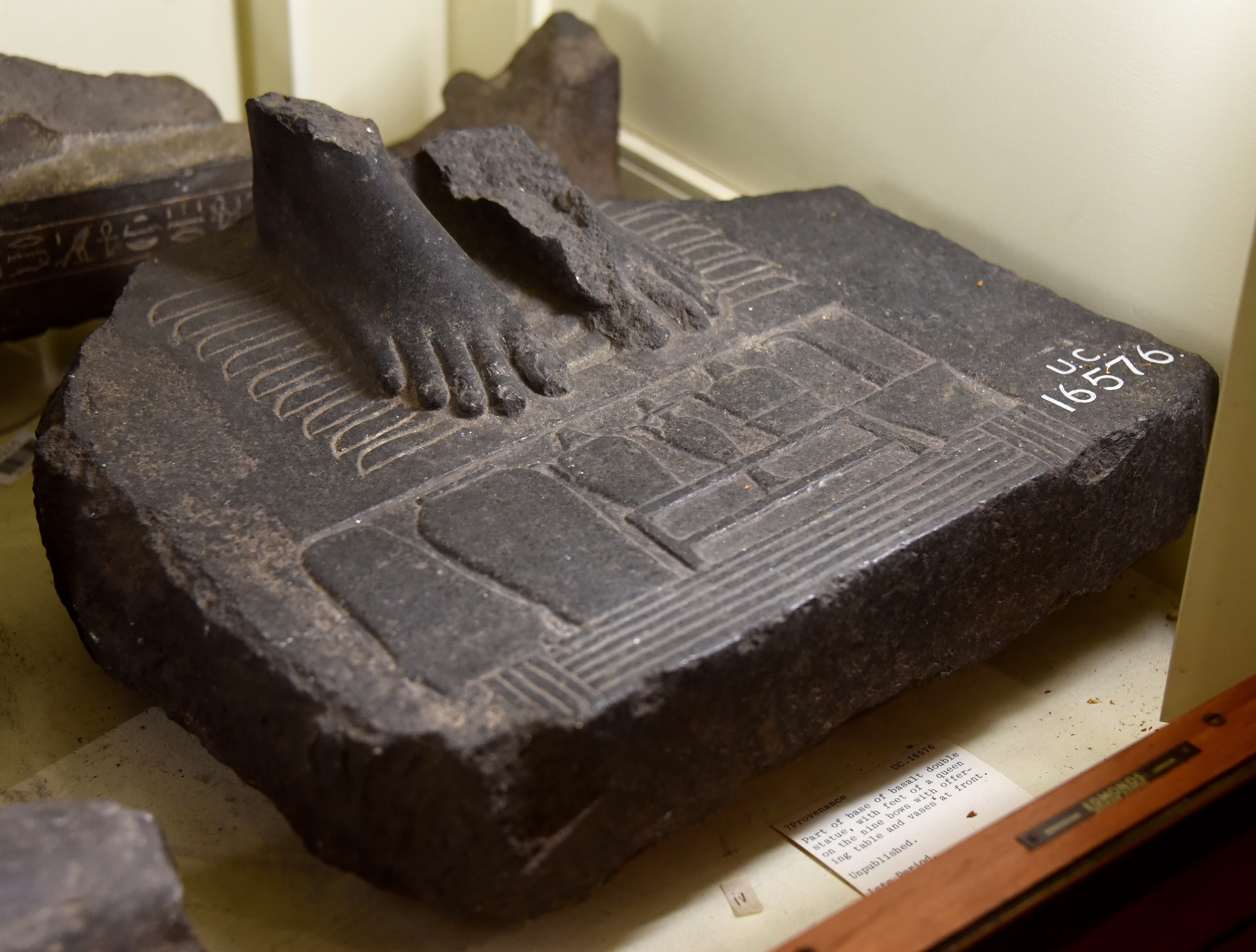
Fragment of the base of a basalt statue dated to the Late Period, the Nine Bows being beneath the feet of the subject of the statue

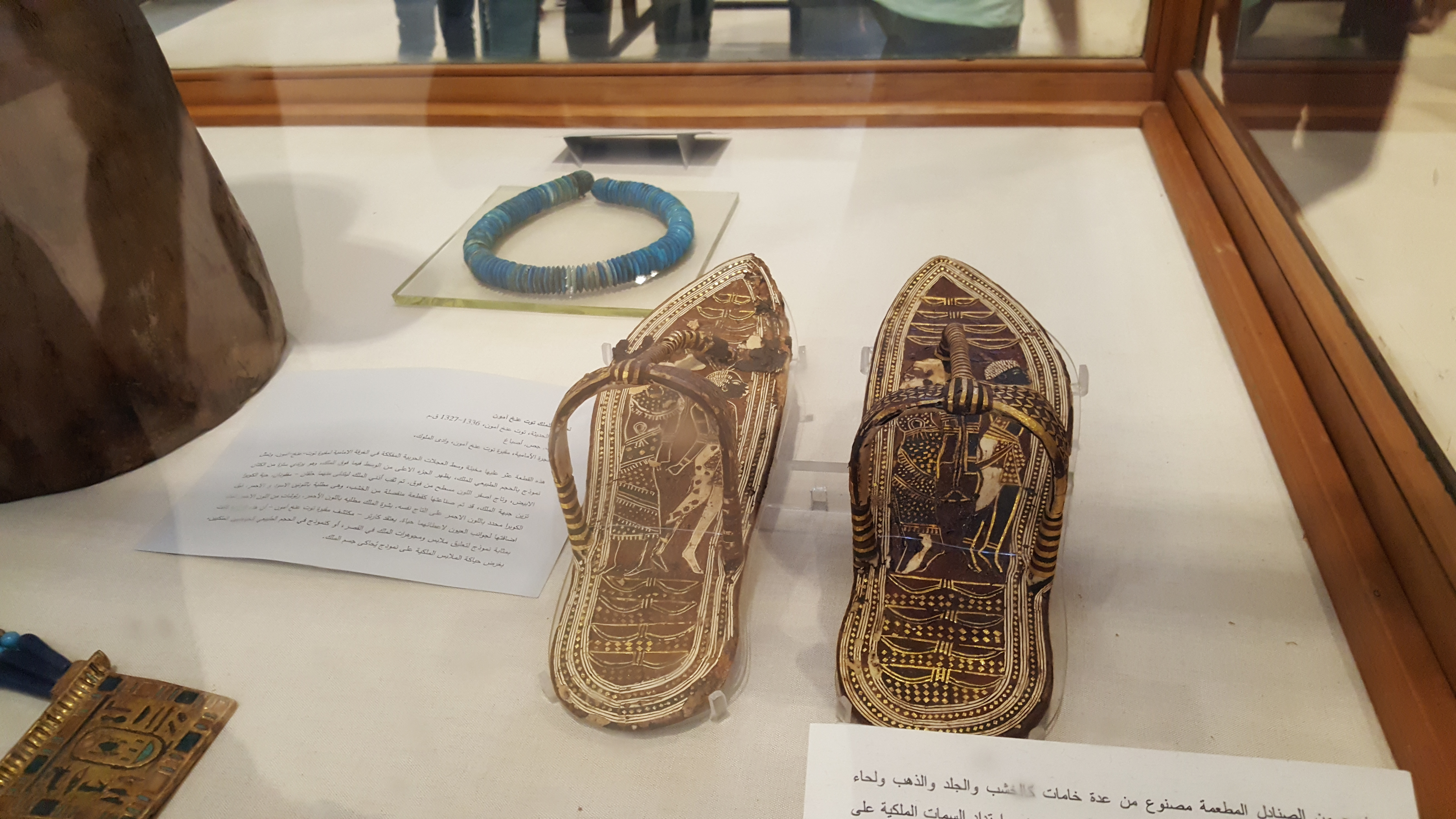
Sandals of Tutankhamun, showing foreigners alongside eight bows and the ninth being the sandal strap

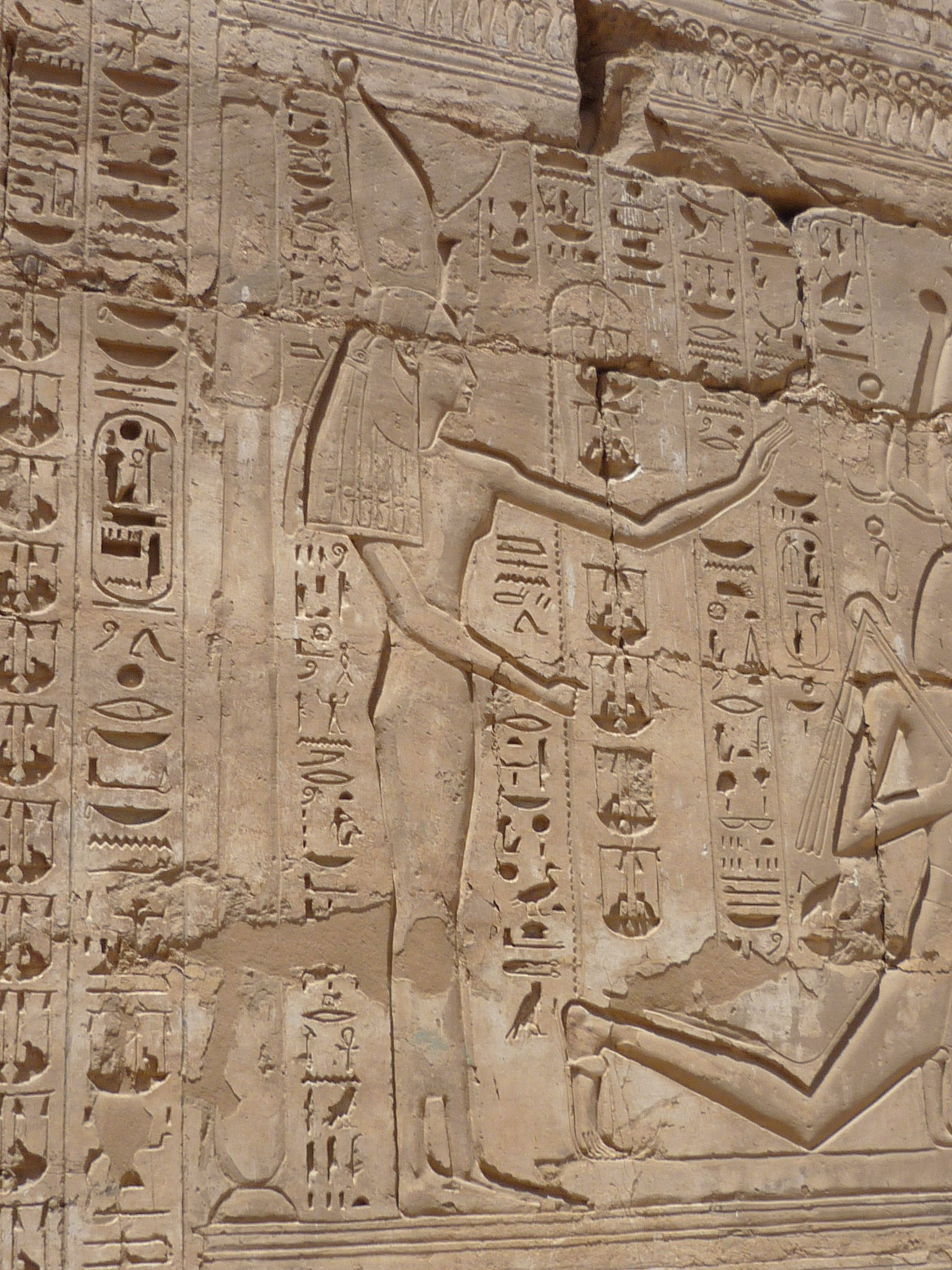
Wall relief of Mut, mortuary temple of Ramses III, Medinet Habu, Theban Necropolis, Egypt

== Sources ==
- Kevin A. Wilson (2005). The Campaign of Pharaoh Shoshenq I Into Palestine. Mohr Siebeck.
