= Portraiture in ancient Egypt =

Art in Egypt from 3400 BC to 300 AD

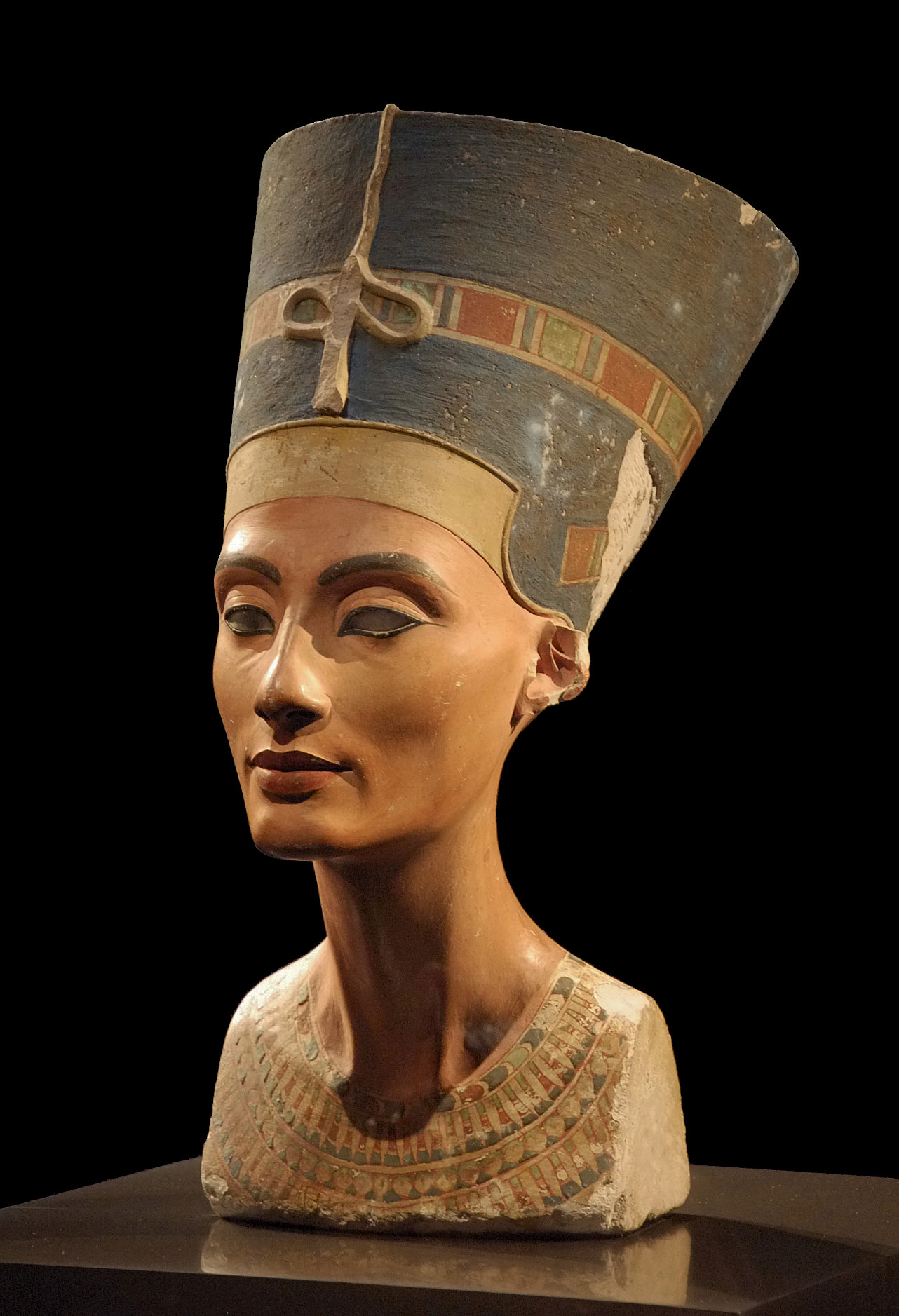
Nefertiti bust, from the 18th dynasty, New kingdom

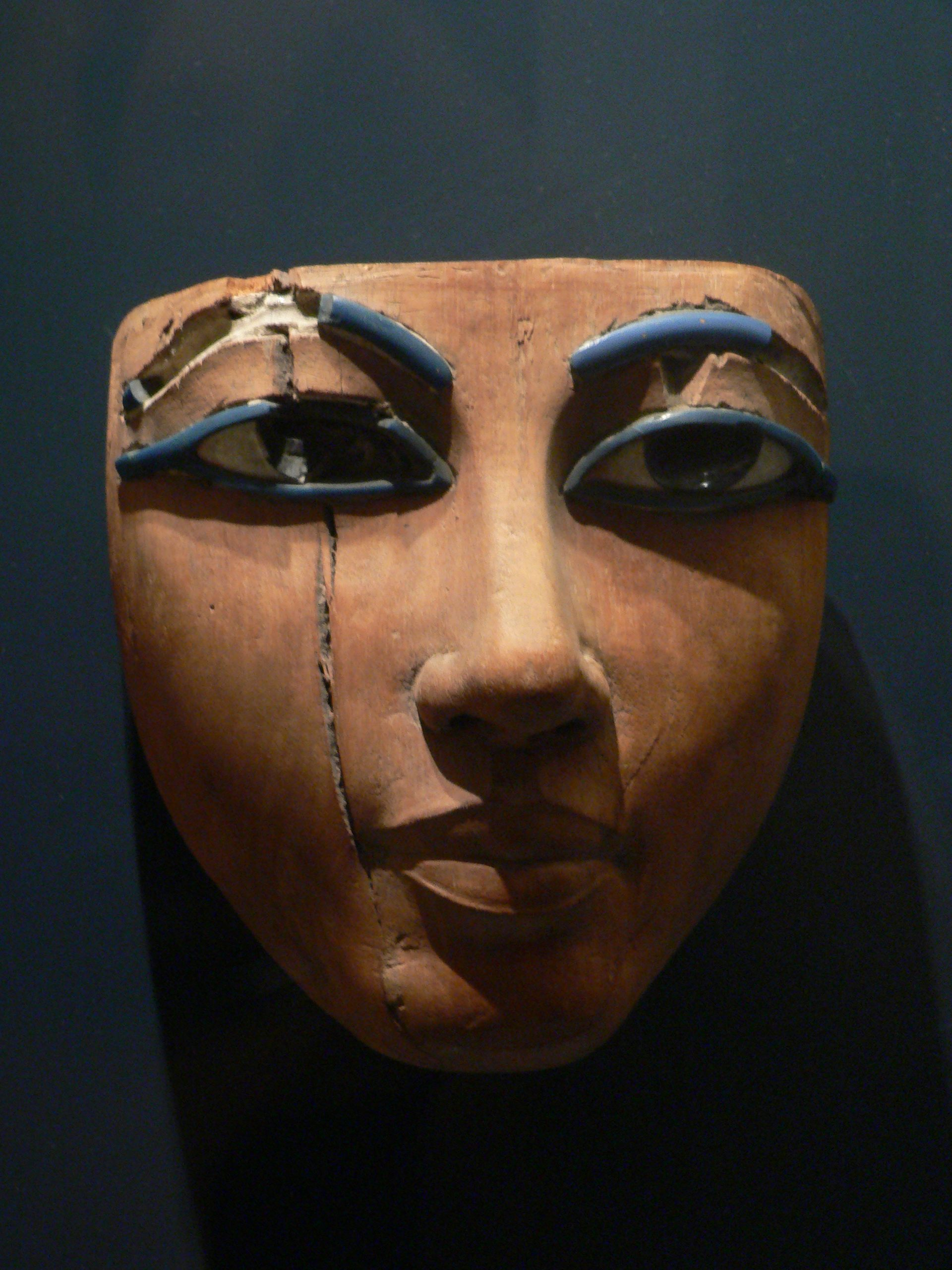
Egyptian death mask from the 18th dynasty. Louvre, Paris

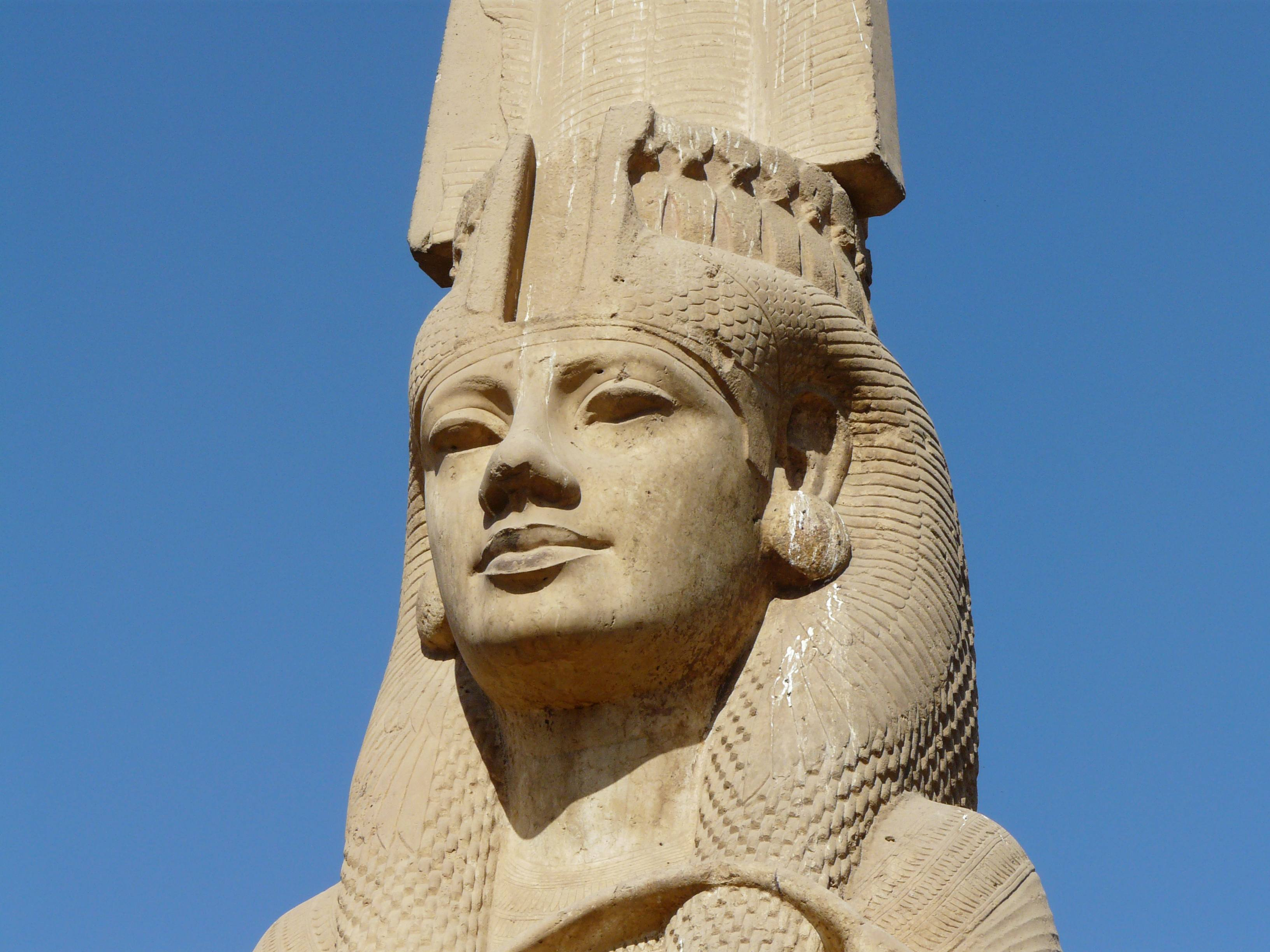
Portrait of Meritamun, 19th dynasty of Egypt

In ancient Egypt, portraiture formed a conceptual attempt to portray "the subject from its own perspective rather than the viewpoint of the artist ... to communicate essential information about the object itself". Ancient Egyptian art was a religious tool used "to maintain perfect order in the universe" and to substitute for the real thing or person through its representation.

Artistic conservatism during the 3000 years of the Dynastic age was a direct result of the ideal of Ma'at. Modification and innovation would have moved art away from the initial state of perfection that was present at the time of the creation of the universe. The deceased "had to advertise for his or her adherence to ... Ma'at" and therefore, chose the most perfect way to represent him/herself and excluded his/her imperfect qualities. In this civilisation, "a statue of a person was believed to be a permanent abode for the spirit of that individual and guaranteed his or her eternal life after death". Such idealized representation of the deceased made him "eternally beautiful" and attested to his sinless life. In an attempt to "convey the spectrum (and totality) of the deceased's personality" rather than merely the physical image, there was a "reluctance to show individual features ... because it conflicted with the representation of the perfect person".

When discussing portraiture in ancient Egypt it is important to differentiate between the modern concept of portraiture and its ancient Egyptian counterpart. In Western art, portraiture captures the exact physical resemblance of a person as well as his/her inner qualities. Ancient Egyptian art had religious roots and functions, and therefore, the result is quite different. To assess ancient Egyptian art and portraiture, it must be examined on its own terms and within its specific cultural context.

== Overview ==
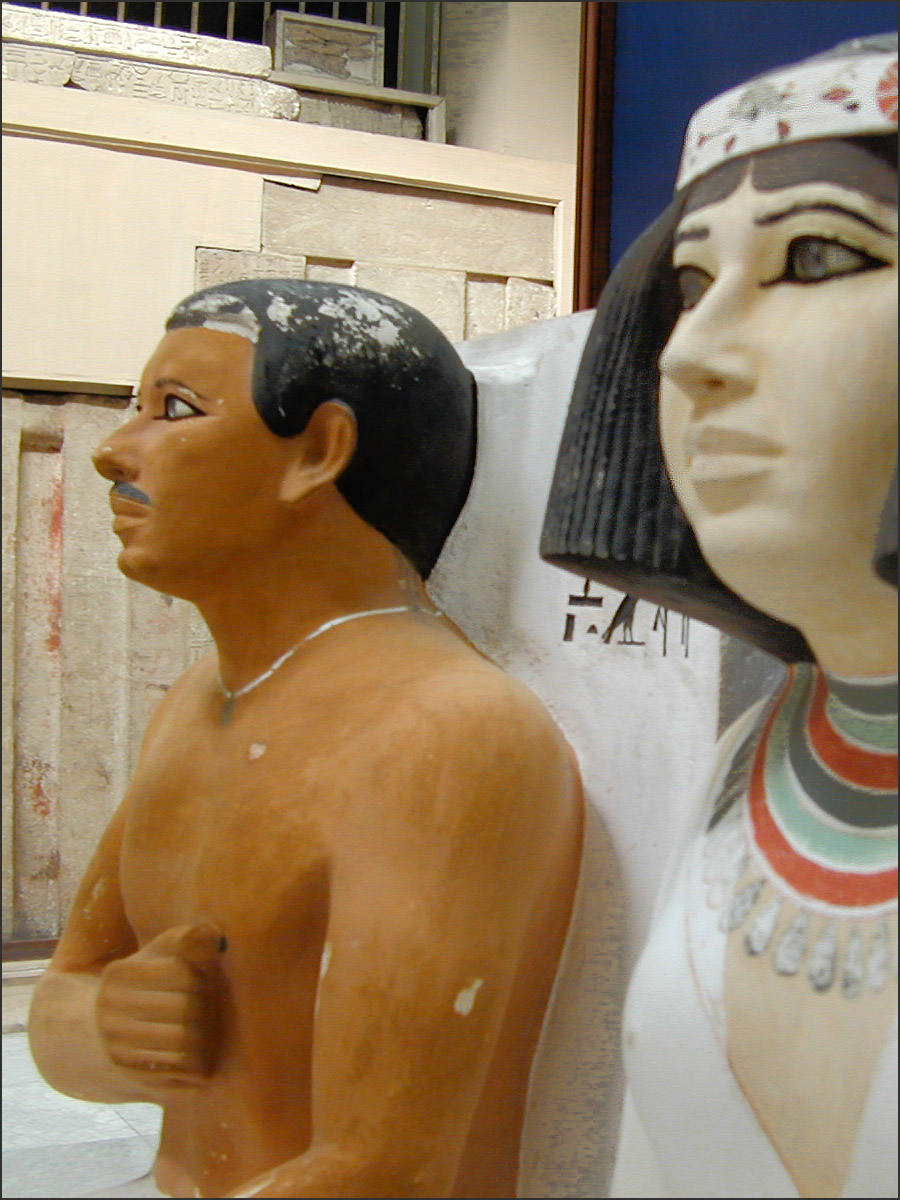
Prince Rahotep son of king Snefru and brother of king Khufu of Old Kingdom, and his wife

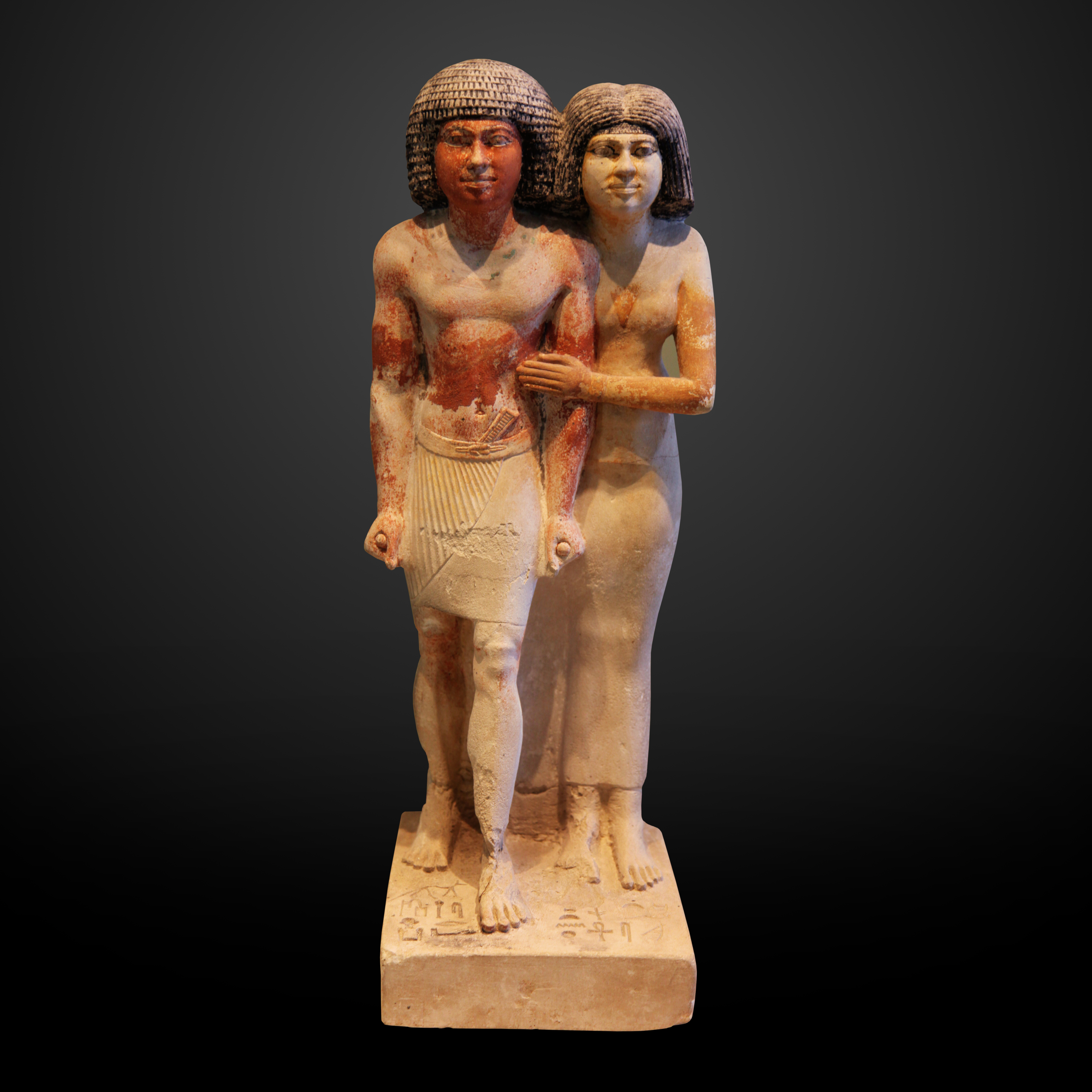
Statue of Raherka and Meresankh. Raherka is depicted with realistic looking musculature.

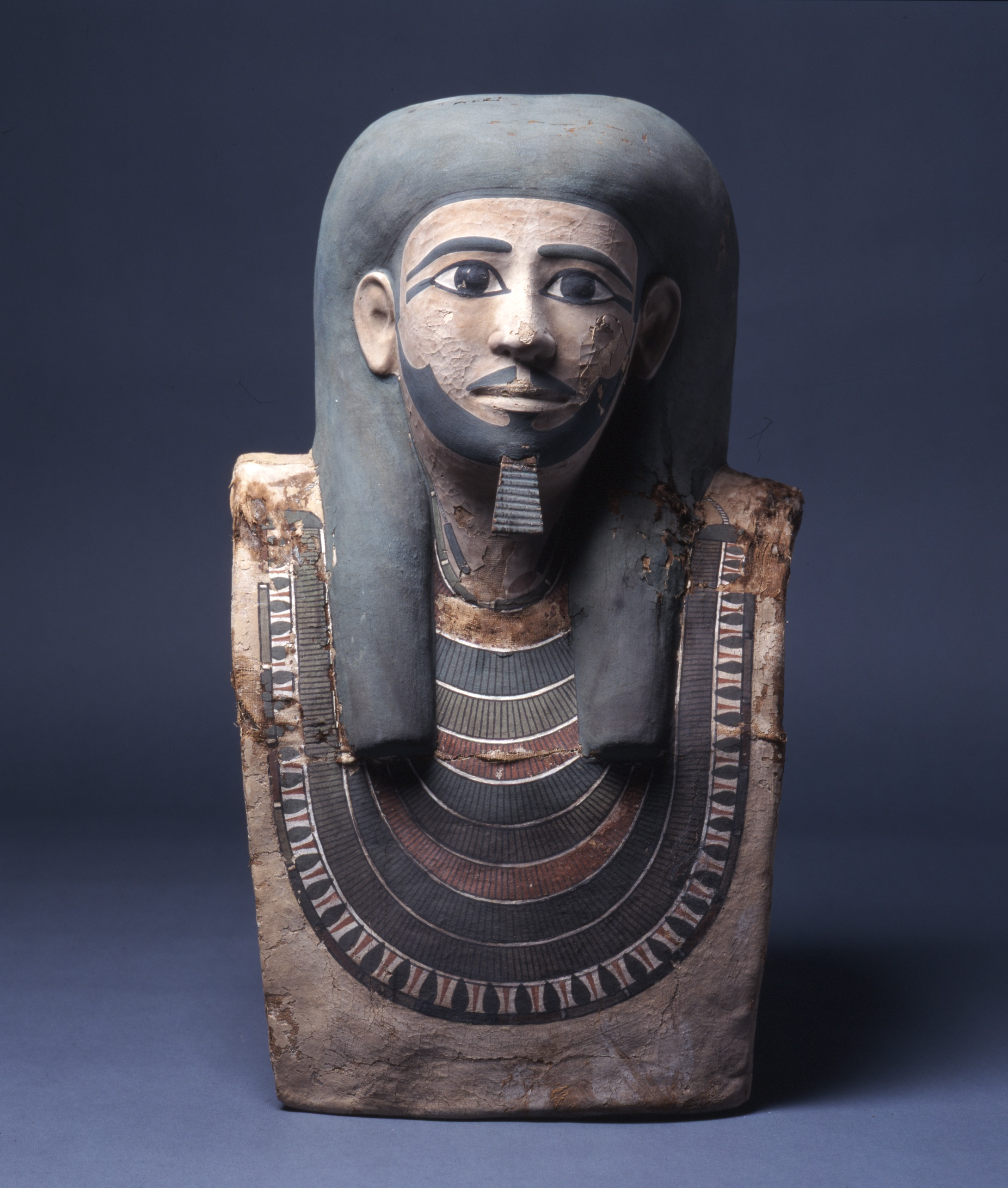
Gemiem-hat an official in early Middle Kingdom

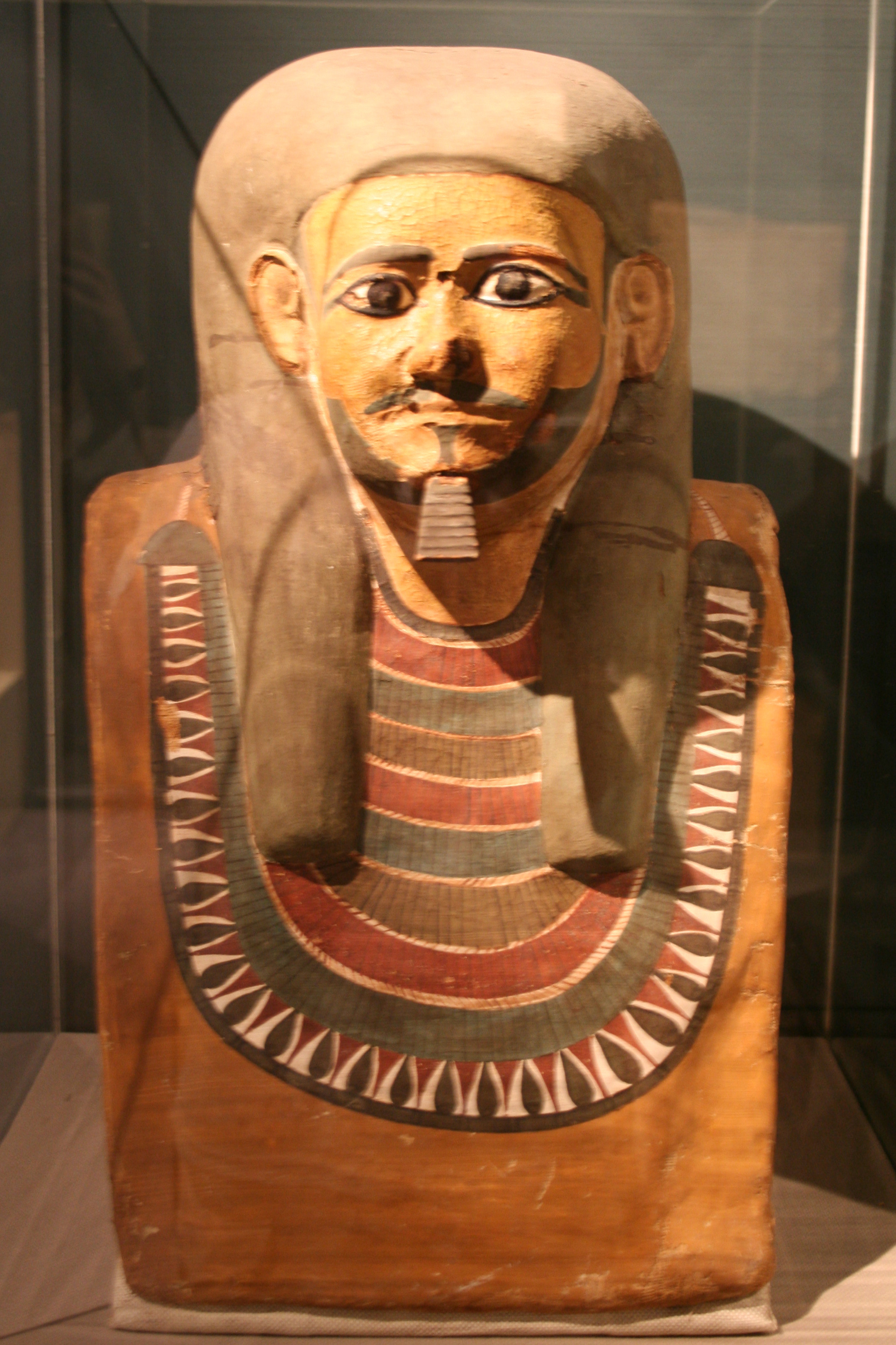
Herishefhotep, an official in early Middle kingdom of ancient Egypt

Idealism apparent in ancient Egyptian art in general and specifically in portraiture was employed by choice, not as a result of lack of proficiency or talent. This is evident in the detailed and realistic depiction of birds and animals. This choice was made for religious, political, magical, ethical and social reasons. What can be defined as a portrait outside of the western tradition? It is difficult to understand the ancient Egyptians' concept of portraiture, and therefore in approaching portraiture from ancient Egypt one must try to ignore the modern concept of what a portrait should be. "The Egyptians sought something very different in their representations of the human, and we should not judge them by our own standards". After understanding why "portraits" were made in ancient Egypt, one can debate whether they are real portraits especially when they are examined "through ancient eyes".

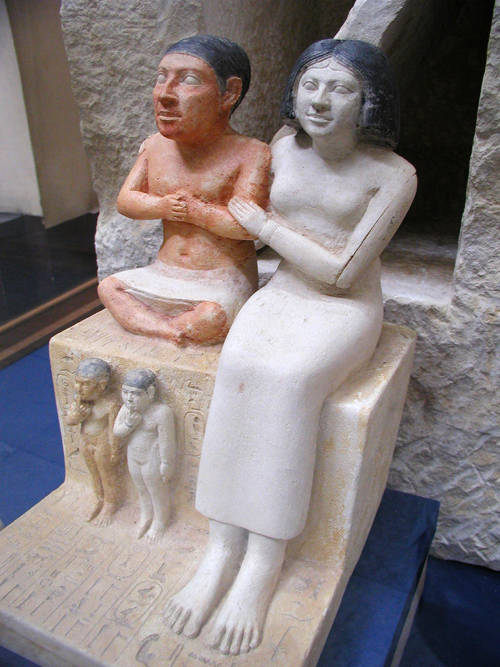
Portraits of the dwarf Seneb and his wife, 4th Dynasty. Seneb's dwarfism is portrayed realistically, but his wife and children are depicted as archetypes.

There are three concepts one must bear in mind when looking at ancient Egyptian portraiture: "the person represented may have chosen the particular form, and for him or her, it was real"; "Egyptian may have seen his individuality expressed in terms of conformity to Ma'at"; and "the sense of identity in ancient Egypt was different from ours".

A statue was believed to convey a person's true identity merely by bearing an inscription of its owner's name upon it. The identity of a person fully inhabited it regardless whether there was any physical or facial resemblance. Other factors contributing to the further clarification of the person's identity could include a certain facial expression, a physical action or pose, or presence of certain official regalia (for example, the scribal palette). As to the king's identity, it was determined through his various royal epithets as well as his different manifestations as a human, deity or animal, and as a sphinx. Sometimes certain physical features reoccur in statues and reliefs of the same person, but that does not mean that they are portraits but rather a manifestation is a single quality or aspect.

The preservation of the deceased body through mummification affected tomb sculpture as artistic objects were created to help further preserve the body for the afterlife. Such objects are apotropaic amulets that "ensured the eternal existence of the deceased's soul" and "naturalistically sculpted heads of the deceased – reserve heads – (that functioned as) substitutes in case the skull was damaged". In such funerary context, the deceased's statue was not just an abode for his personality, but also became the focal point of the cult's offerings; in other words, "the image became the reality". As the deceased wished to be remembered as an upright and blameless individual, the ka statues tend to be idealized.

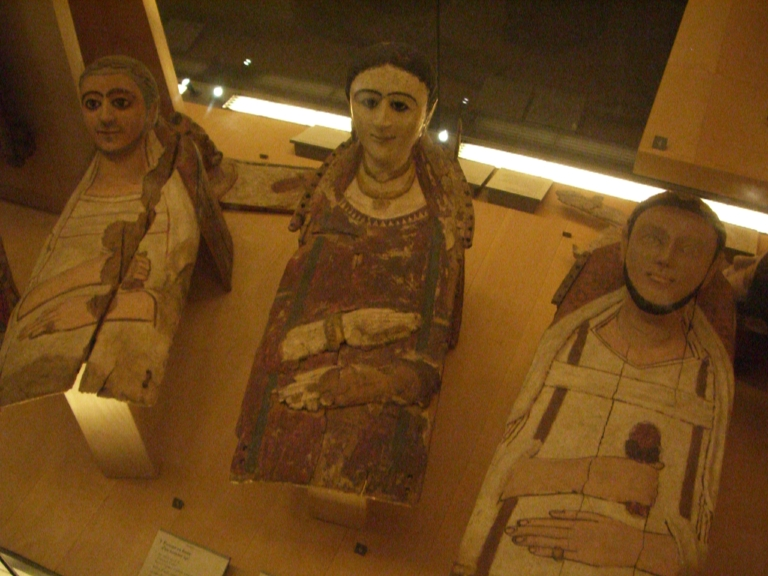
Egyptian funerary masks

Many royal ideal representations are a "type of countenance ... including iconographic and stylistic details (to convey the king's) physiognomical characteristics (as well as) physical particularities with a great deal of traditional idealization". In other words, they are idealized well studied forms of the ruling kind, and sometimes, hard to be discarded with his death. Therefore, the deceased king's idealized form may prevail during the beginning of his successor's reign till the artists found a new conventionalized form to represent the new king. Also, such borrowing of older forms of representations was also used during the Kushite and Saite periods as efforts for a renaissance of the arts. However, it was sometimes an exact copy of older reliefs to the point of even copying the exact names and titles of the older relief as is the case with the relief of "Taharqa as Sphinx trampling fallen enemies" and a 5th Dynasty relief in the Sun Temple in Abu Sir.

The concept of portraiture is still debated with regards to Egyptian art, but also, its modern definition. The debate arises because of the expression of the inner qualities – that have no concrete manifestation – in contrast to the physical resemblance that is more emphasized for the easy identification of the subject. In other words, portraiture is very subjective as it is not a mere photographic shot of the person. Nevertheless, throughout history, the inner life was found to be more important because it is the main characteristic of an individual and continuous attempts are made to further express such a fleeting concept visually. As a result, likeness between the image and the model could be a more exact expression of such concept as the main idea is to convey a huge spectrum of different types of the model's qualities rather than mechanically reproduce the external features.

== Idealism, naturalism and realism ==
Religious and funerary influence on ancient Egyptian art is great as is made it utilitarian rather than aesthetic mainly "commissioned for the tomb or the temple destined to be seen by only a few persons". Therefore, idealizing work is propagandistic to represent "the perfect human figure, the culmination of all that the Egyptians held to be good" as religion and fear of death and the afterlife were ruling forces over the Egyptians' minds and idealism is a means for them to achieve the desired happy ending as "it compromises a tangible affirmation of the individual's adherence to Ma'at and virtue as proclaimed in tomb biographies and chapter 125 of the Book of the Dead". Therefore, to achieve the expression of the "virtuous" person, the artist's perception and techniques of portrayal underwent "the process of selection, deletion and arrangement".

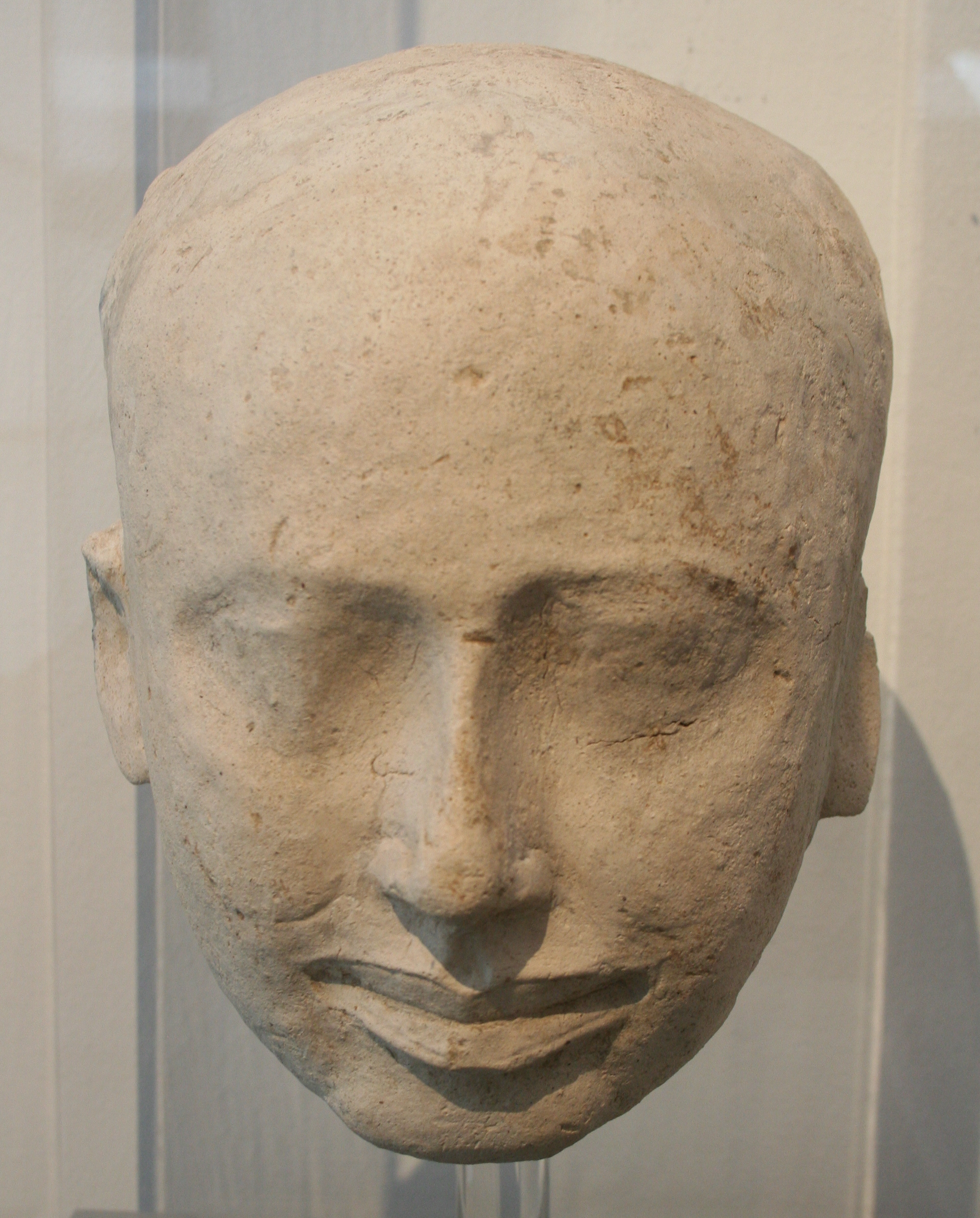
Plaster death mask

Idealism is often used as a means to indicate status. Old age is a sign of wisdom and hard work as in Senwosret III's case as well as wealth expressed through corpulence of the body. Nevertheless, old men are rarely depicted, but such work is found almost in every period especially in the Old and Middle Kingdoms while it can reach photographic realism in the Saite period. There is a great difference between kings and queens depictions, and the non-royal. As the king and queen are both royal as well as religious institutions by themselves, they can only be rendered as perfect as possible. Hence, idealism is used and with the progress of time, introducing normal tendencies were introduced. This is not necessarily the case with normal folk or even high status officials: they can be realistically and individually rendered such is the case with the bust of Ankhhaf of the fourth dynasty. The latter is a special and unique case since the prevailing inclinations to emulate the royal way of portrayal especially of very high status officials as is the case with Ankhhaf. There is a general observation that the lower the social status the less idealistic and conventional rendering of the person. Still, such works are still debated whether they are true portraits or idealized and conventionalized.

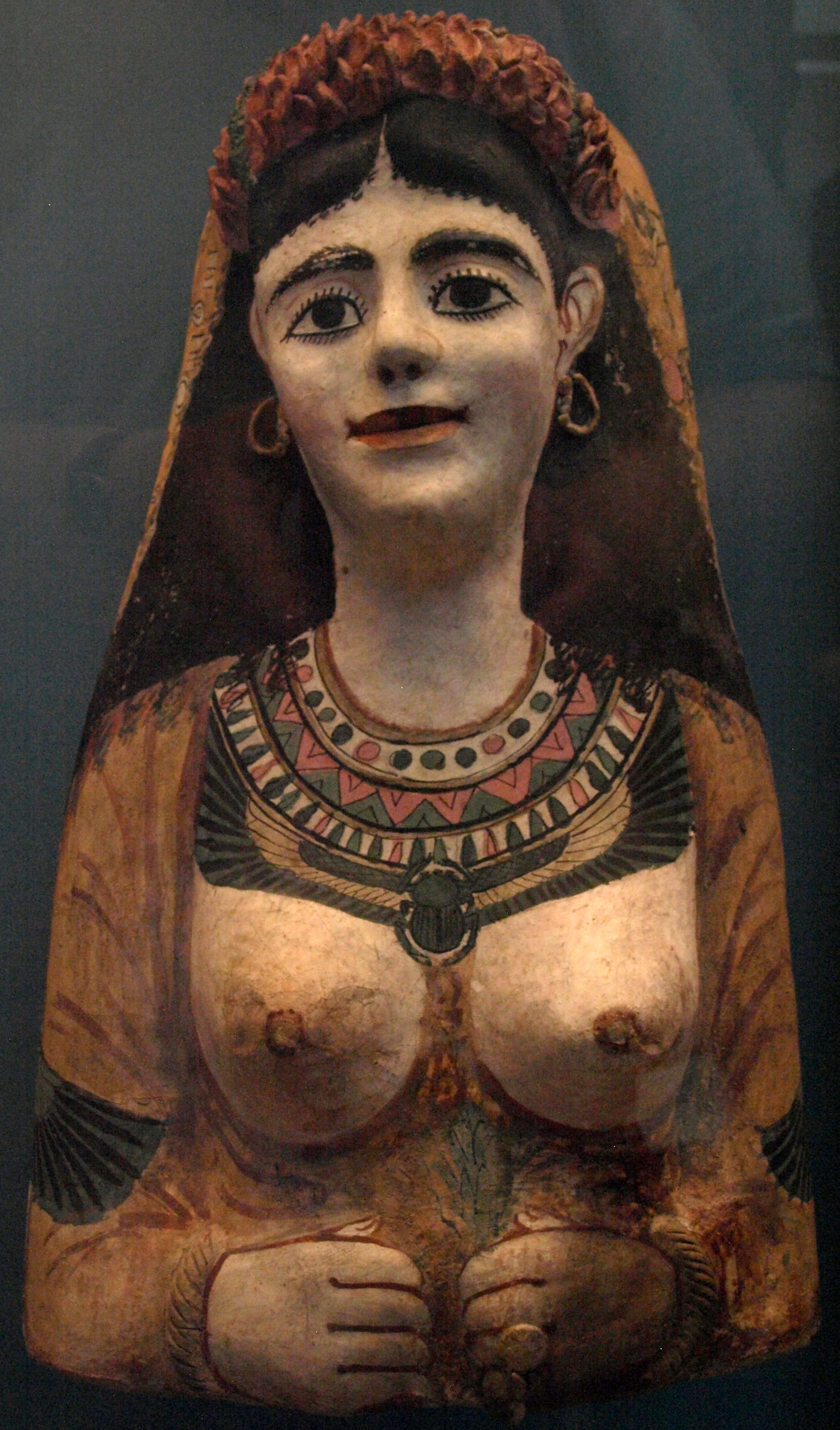
Painted plaster cartonnage mask from the Roman Period, circa 100–120 CE. EA 29476

As to women, few naturalistic works of women prior to Late Period and Ptolemaic Period existed and "the great majority of female representations are idealized". Mainly, noble and high status women were highly idealized to express their eternal youth, beauty and fertility. This is not the case for non-elite women. The latter exhibit more variety of postures, costumes, activity and age as seen in scenes of working women, market places, and mothers and off springs. Such scenes have women with protruding bellies, sagging breasts, deep naso-labial folds ...etc. resulting into sometimes ugly, inelegant effect.

Naturalism in art, the accurate depiction of the visual appearance of things, is not necessarily portraiture. It is sometimes distinguished (although the usage of both terms is highly variable) from realism, "which is the rendering of the qualities, (inner and outer), of a particular person" However, both avoid the abstractive nature of idealism. This does not mean that naturalism and idealism cannot coexist because they do especially in royal portraiture that conventionalizes and idealizes some of the king's chosen features. Naturalistic tendencies were mildly introduced during the Old and Middle Kingdoms in non- royal artworks and some royal (12th Dynasty: note Senwosret III and Amenemhat III's), then again, during the Amarna period as seen in the awkward depiction of Akhenaton's features and body as well as in some of Nefertiti's. Also, note the resemblance between the profiles (especially the noses) of both Thutmose III and Set I's statues or reliefs and their mummies.

However, the greatest efforts for naturalism and sometimes an almost brutal verism in royal statuary started with the Kushite kings of the 25th Dynasty. Such naturalistic tendencies were direct influences from Middle Kingdom statuary. Hence, the renaissance that mainly characterizes the 26th Dynasty (Saite Period) started with the Nubian Kings. Since they are Nubians with different physical and facial features, their statues and reliefs were trying to express such differences. Even with their naturalistic tendencies and the recurrence of the same king's features in almost all of his statuaries (e.g. Taharqa), we cannot prove they are realistic work, but at the same time, we cannot prove they are not.

== Artistic framework and the patron ==
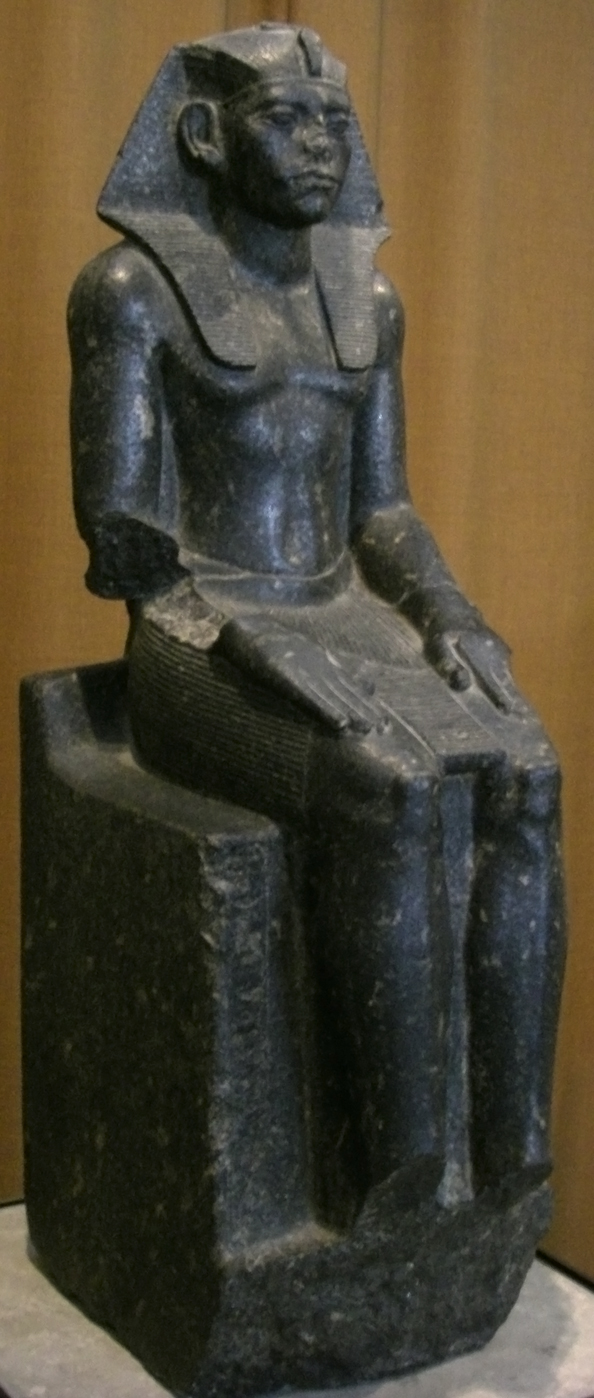
Statue of Amenemhat III from the Egyptian Collection of the Hermitage Museum

Egyptian artists and artisans worked within a strict framework dictated by ethical, religious, social and magical considerations. They were not free to express their personal likes and dislikes even they were not free to produce what they actually saw. Rather, they expressed the patron's wishes. The statue or relief had to conform "to highly developed set of ethical principles and it was the artist's task to represent the model as a loyal adherent", but still considering the naturalizing tendencies evolving with time, it is possible to say that "something of both the physical and appearance and the personality of the individual was made manifest".

King Amenemhat III's sculptures are frequently difficult to distinguish from Senwosret III's; meanwhile, the facial features of both were popular among private sculptures. Both observations further consolidate the idea of the artist as a propagandist for certain dictated ideologies or personal agenda. For instance, Hatshepsut was frequently depicted as a male king. That was an imposed request from her for political reasons to legitimize her rule as a woman (that is considered a sign of decay and chaos) and to emphasize her adherence to Ma'at by ascertaining her male identity. Her divine conception scene is purely propagandistic. Also during the Amarna Period, the change in style might be a result of a change in theology and religion. Akhenaton's depiction is "the most extreme variation from the standard canon... showing the king with an elongated neck, drooping jaw, and fleshly feminine body". That is so to serve the king's new theological program that referred to him as "the agent of creation" and in order to emphasize his "role of androgynous creator god (both male and female at the same time), hence the feminine features of the king". With the change in religion, there was no fear to change the standards of art that was once considered as deviation from perfection. Clearly, in both Hatshepsut and Akhenaton's cases, the artists were forced to portray what they are told not what they saw and that further increases the confusion over the degree of likeness.

== Art-historical interpretation ==
The context of the displayed statue or relief must be put into consideration when studying a piece of art. Was it in the innermost sanctuary of the tomb and meant to be seen only by the gods; or was it monumental, on the first pylon of the temple, and meant to be seen by the public? Context dictates the purpose of the statue or relief, and therefore the patron would have asked for different representations of himself in each situation. Moreover, the intended audience for the piece has great effect on the type of representation required for the piece. If the judges of the afterlife are the intended audience, then the patron would want himself idealized as much as possible in order to adhere to Ma'at and to be capable of inhabiting a perfect and youthful body eternally.

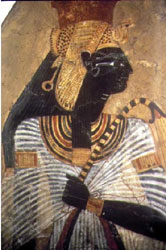
Portrait of Ahmose-Nefertari, Great Royal Wife of Pharao Amosis I (c.1550 A.C.)

However, if the audience were meant to be the masses, then the patron's political agenda would dictate the nature of the representation: the king would want himself portrayed in as powerful and as godlike a way as possible. Also, some private individuals who had the means to commission pieces occasionally ordered highly naturalistic "portraits". Some of them preferred to have themselves portrayed as old and corpulent to show their wisdom and wealth. Who was the audience for such naturalistic pieces? Perhaps the public, perhaps the gods, but certainly the patrons of such works did not believe that they needed to be idealized like a king.

The state of preservation and condition greatly affect how we interpret and evaluate the work at hand. This because "limestone sculptures were occasionally covered with a thin plaster coat, which received additional modeling. The finishing (layer) will obviously obscure or enhance the details of the core sculpture". Most of the naturalistic statues are found with their plaster coat, while the less preserved the coat is, the more idealized the work appears.

Additionally, the condition of the sculptures (whether they were found full-figure or fragmentary) is also a major factor. A person's identity could be determined by a certain action or pose, so if the body is missing, that means vital information about the individual's personality is missing also. "The missing bodies would have had their own indications of personality or stylistic peculiarities".

== Gallery ==
Portraits from predynastic king Narmer 3400 BCE to 300 CE, Old Kingdom, Middle kingdom, New kingdom, Late Period, and Greco-Roman period:

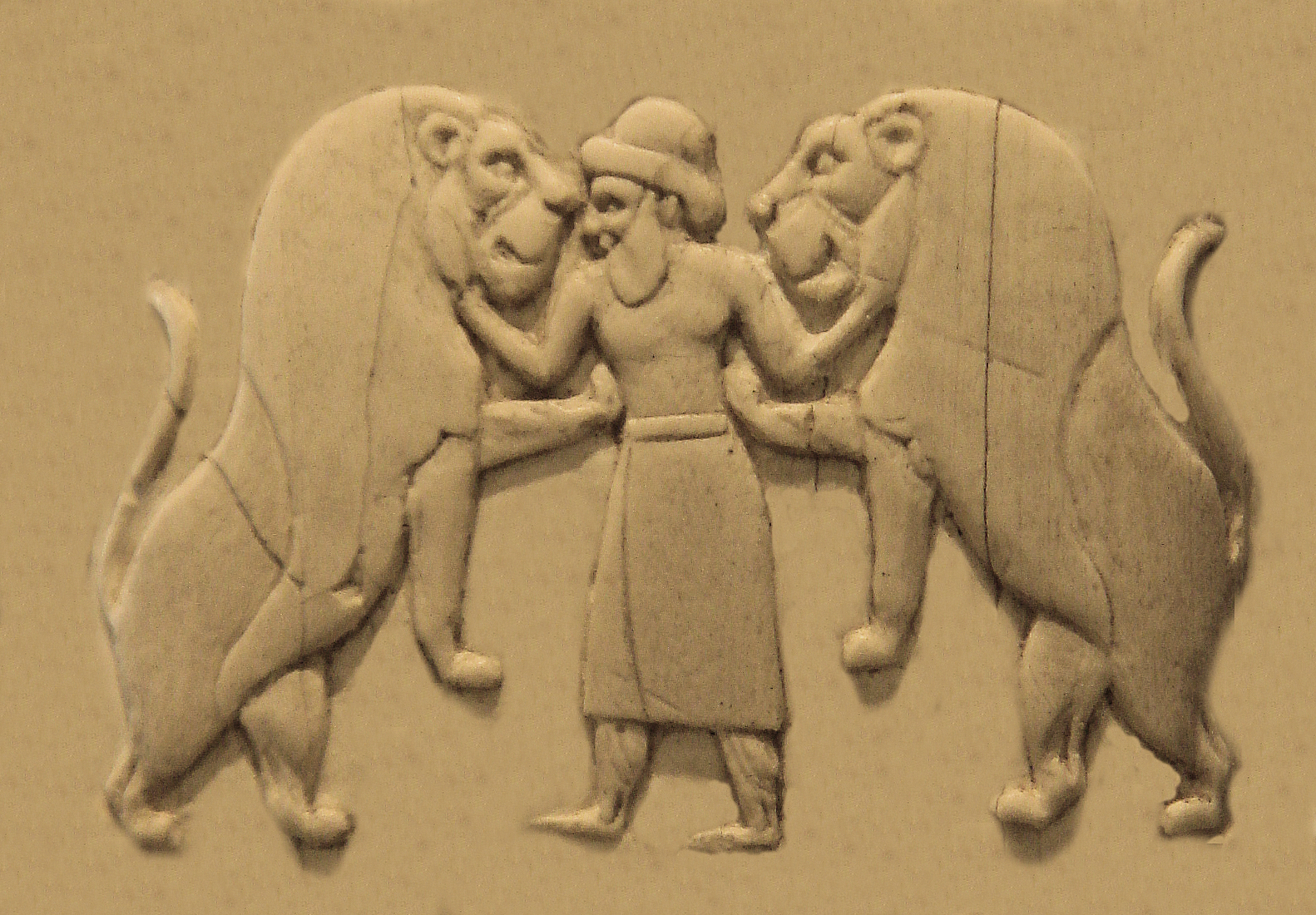
Predynastic 5000 BCE

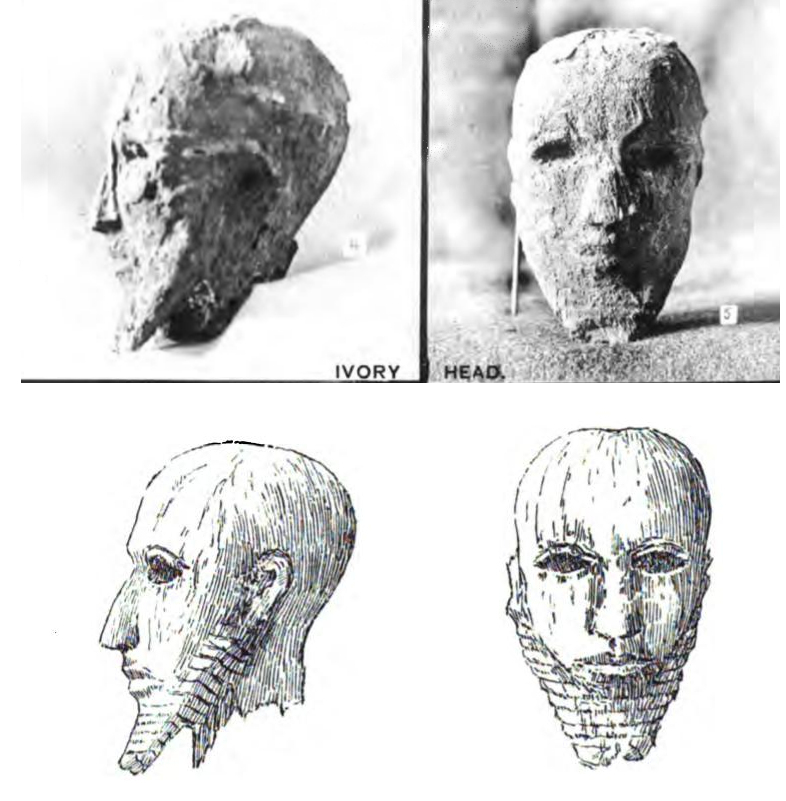

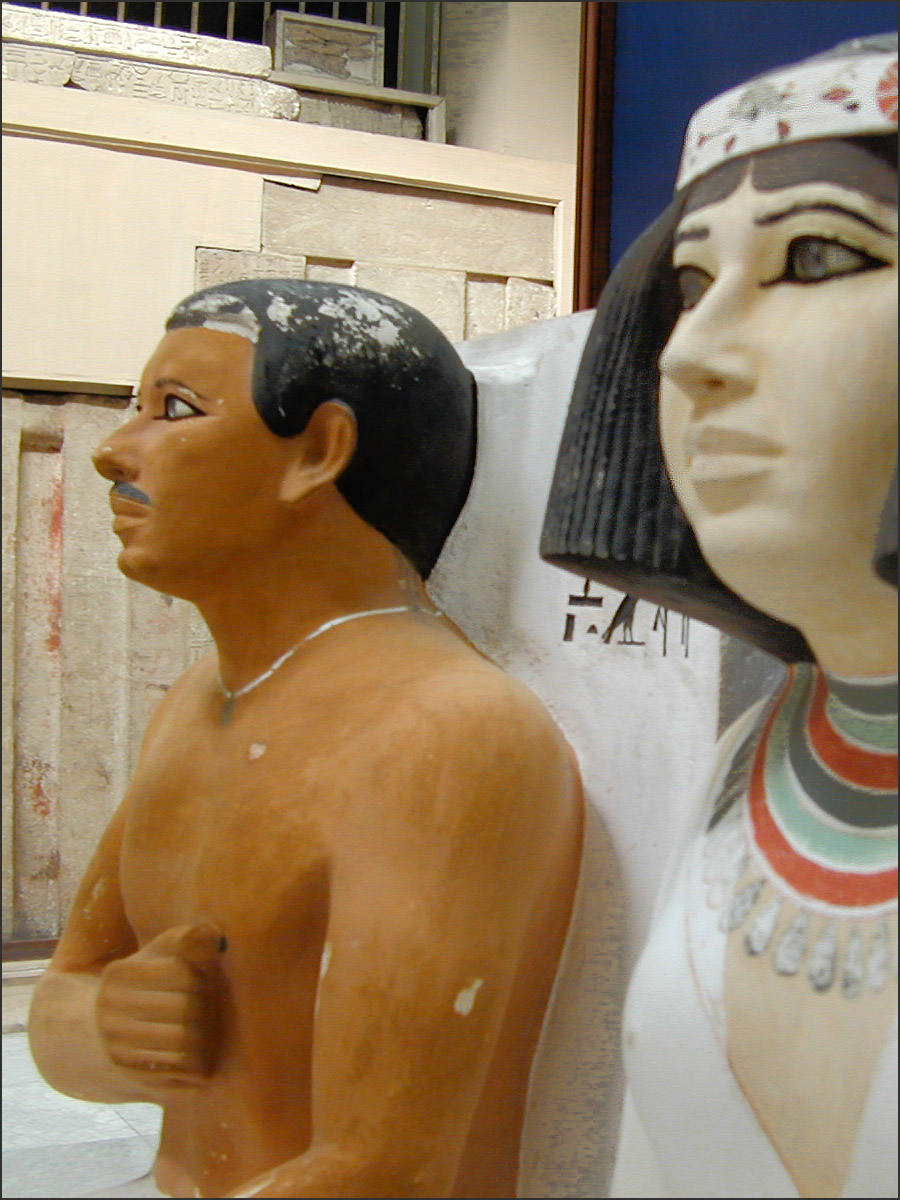
Old Kingdom Prince Rahotep 2600 BCE

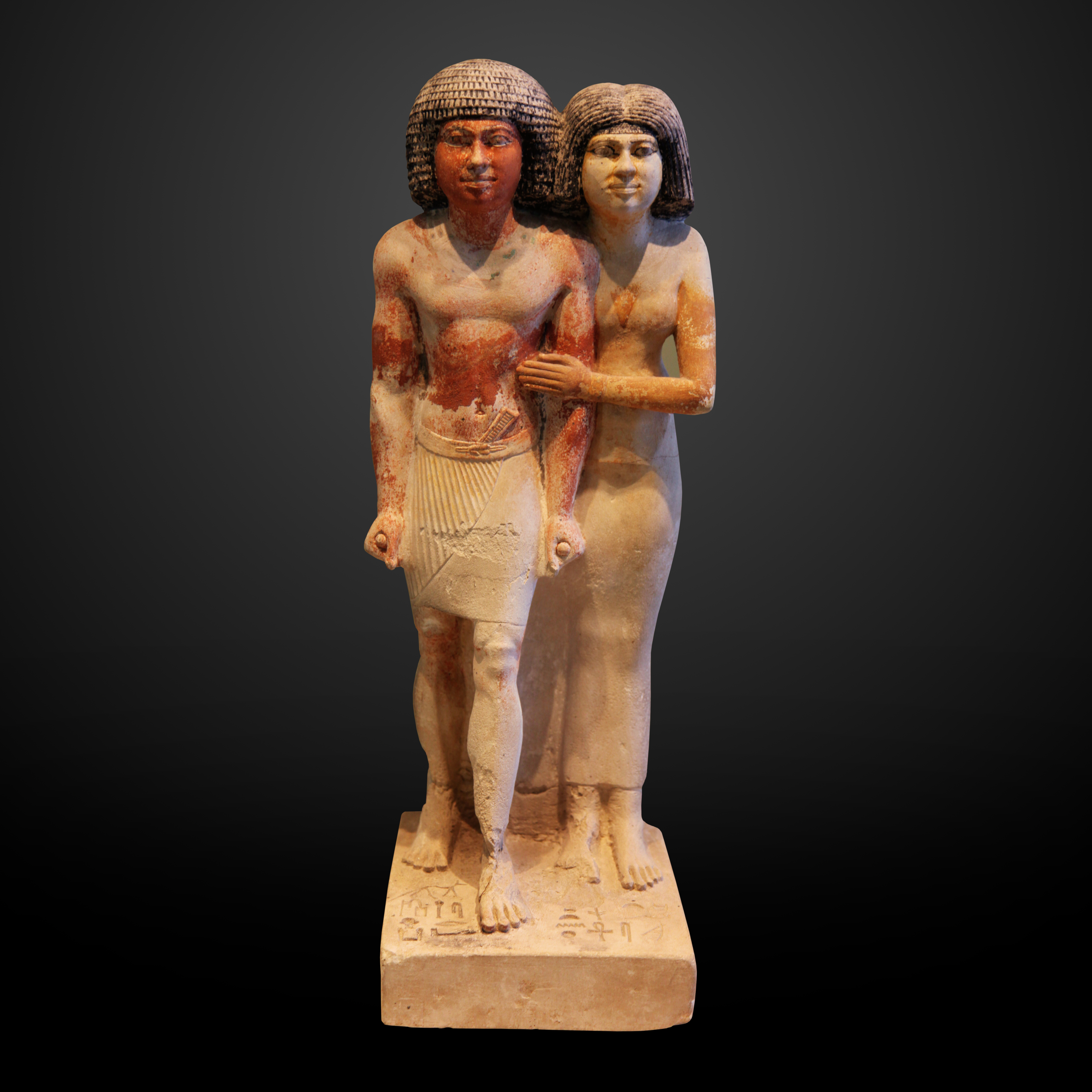
Statue of Raherka and Meresankh. Raherka is depicted with realistic looking musculature.

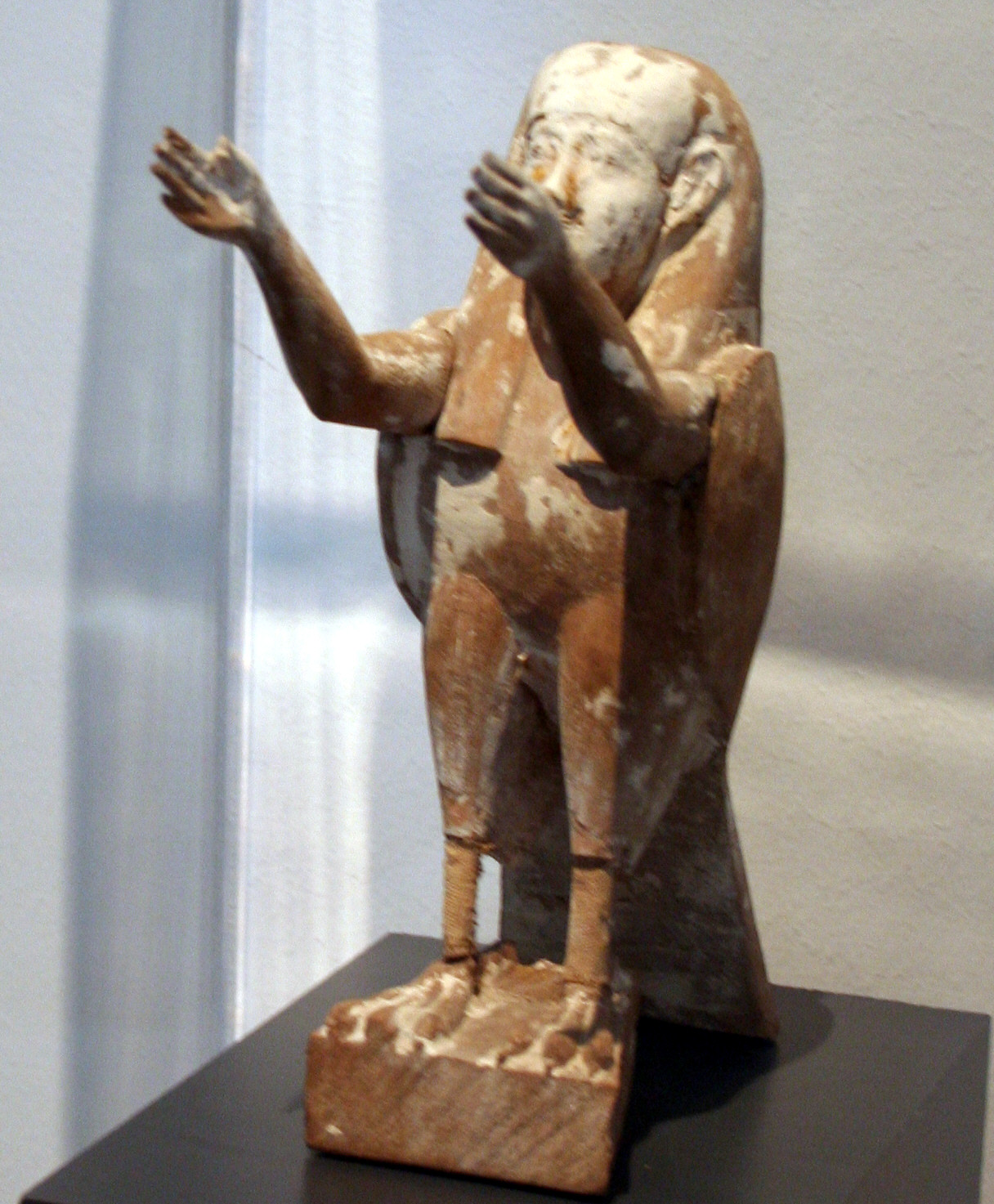

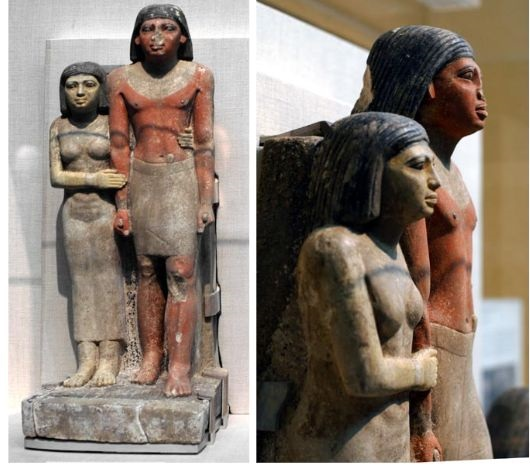

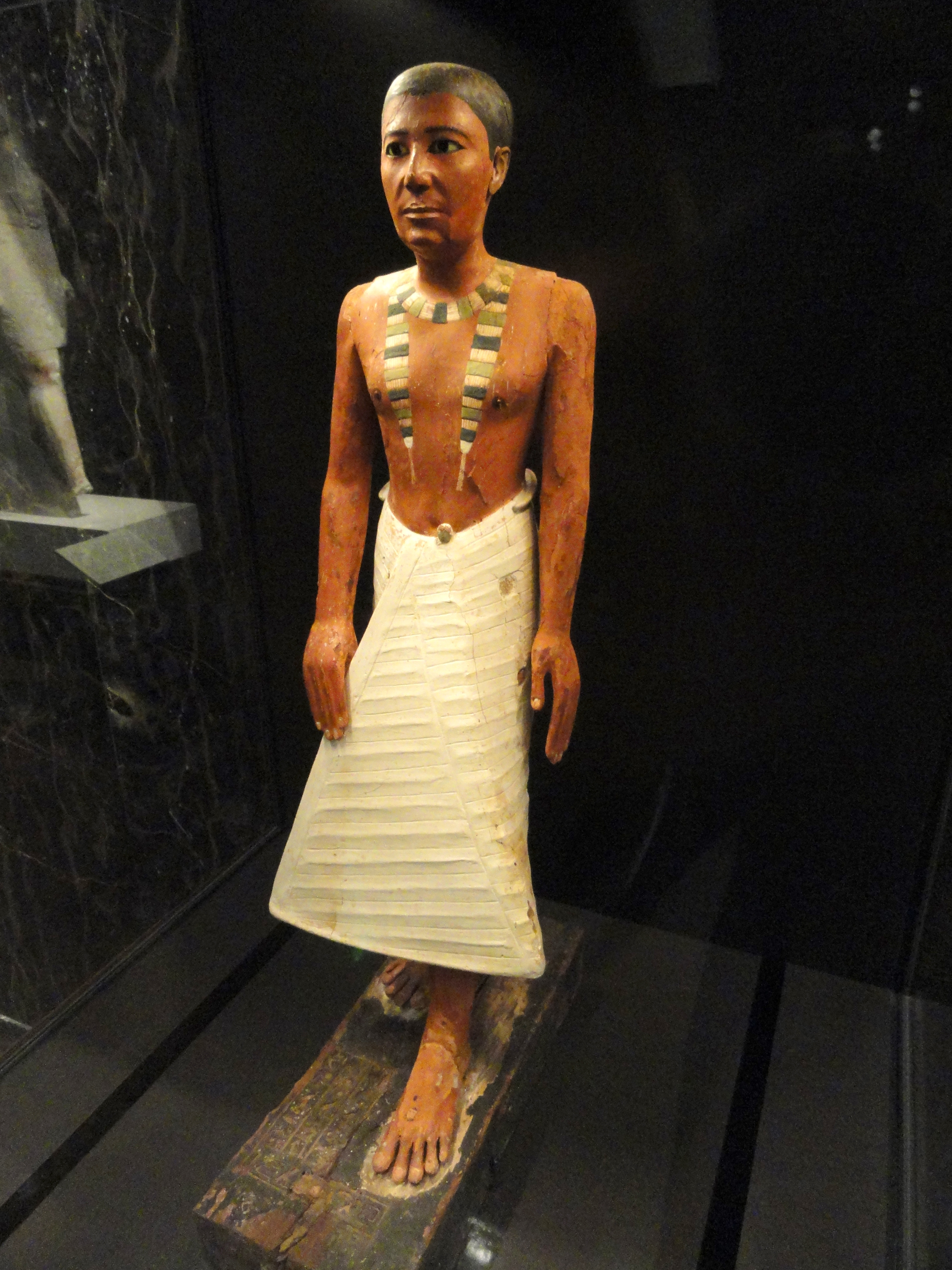

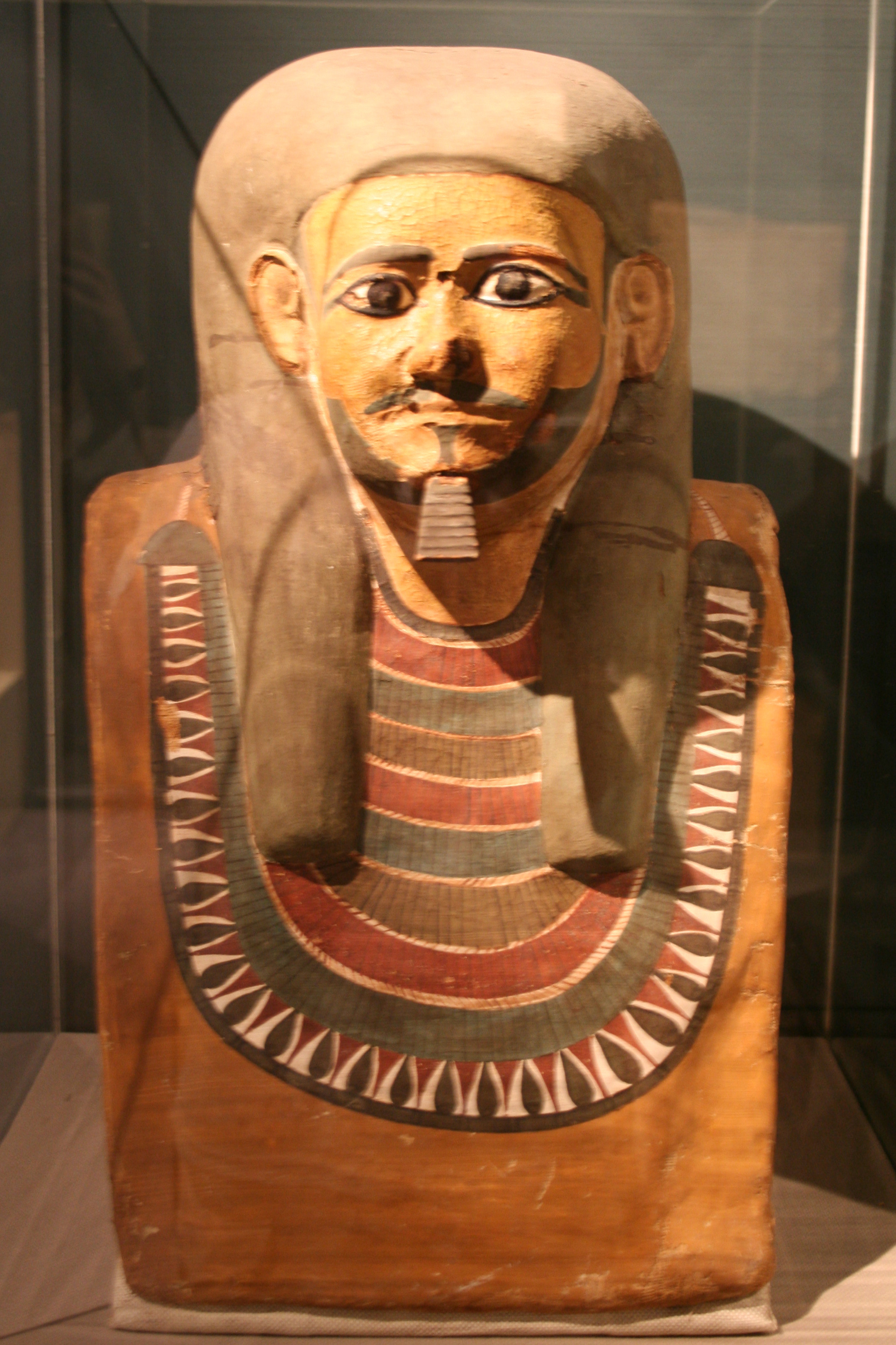

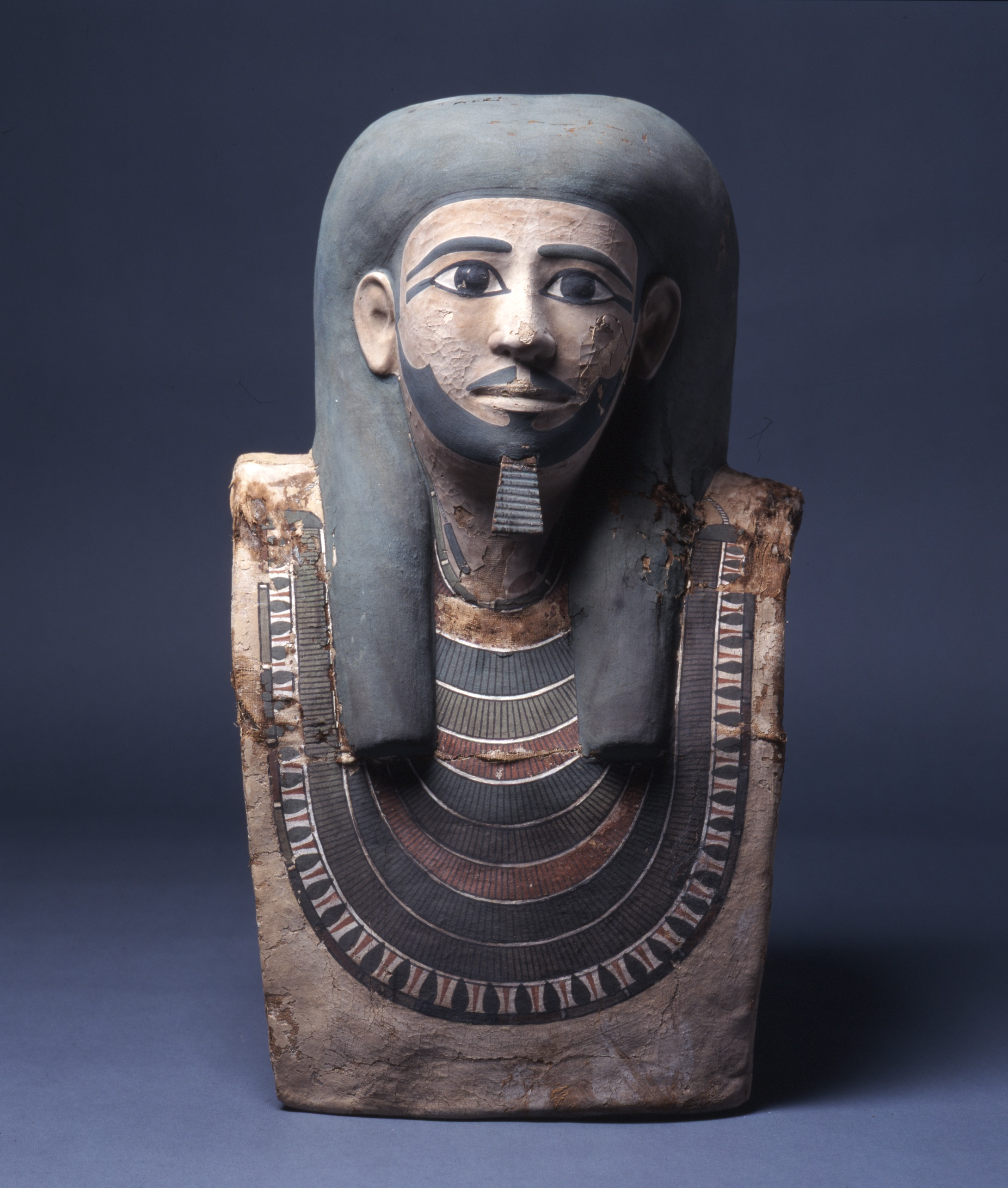
Gemiem-hat, Middle Kingdom

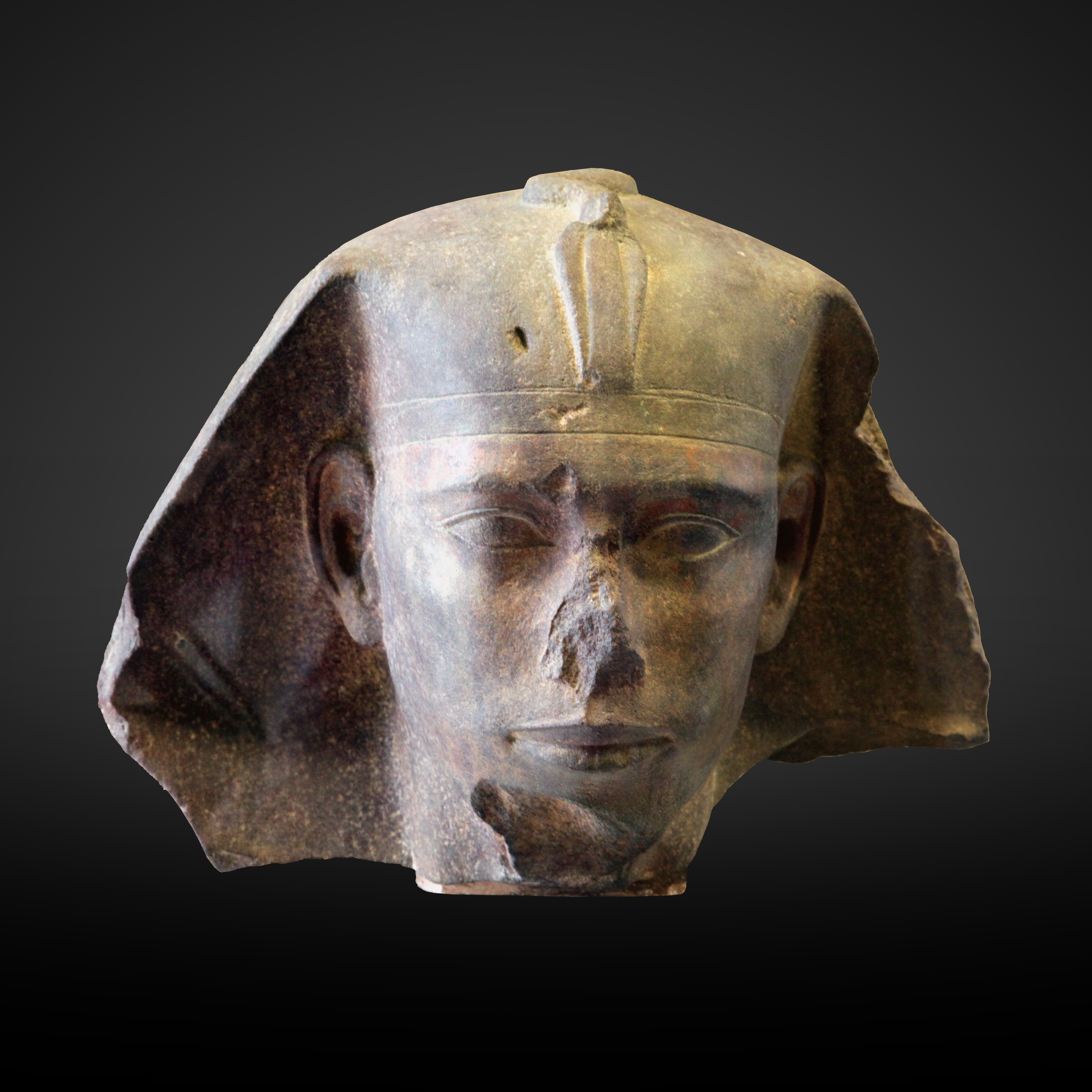

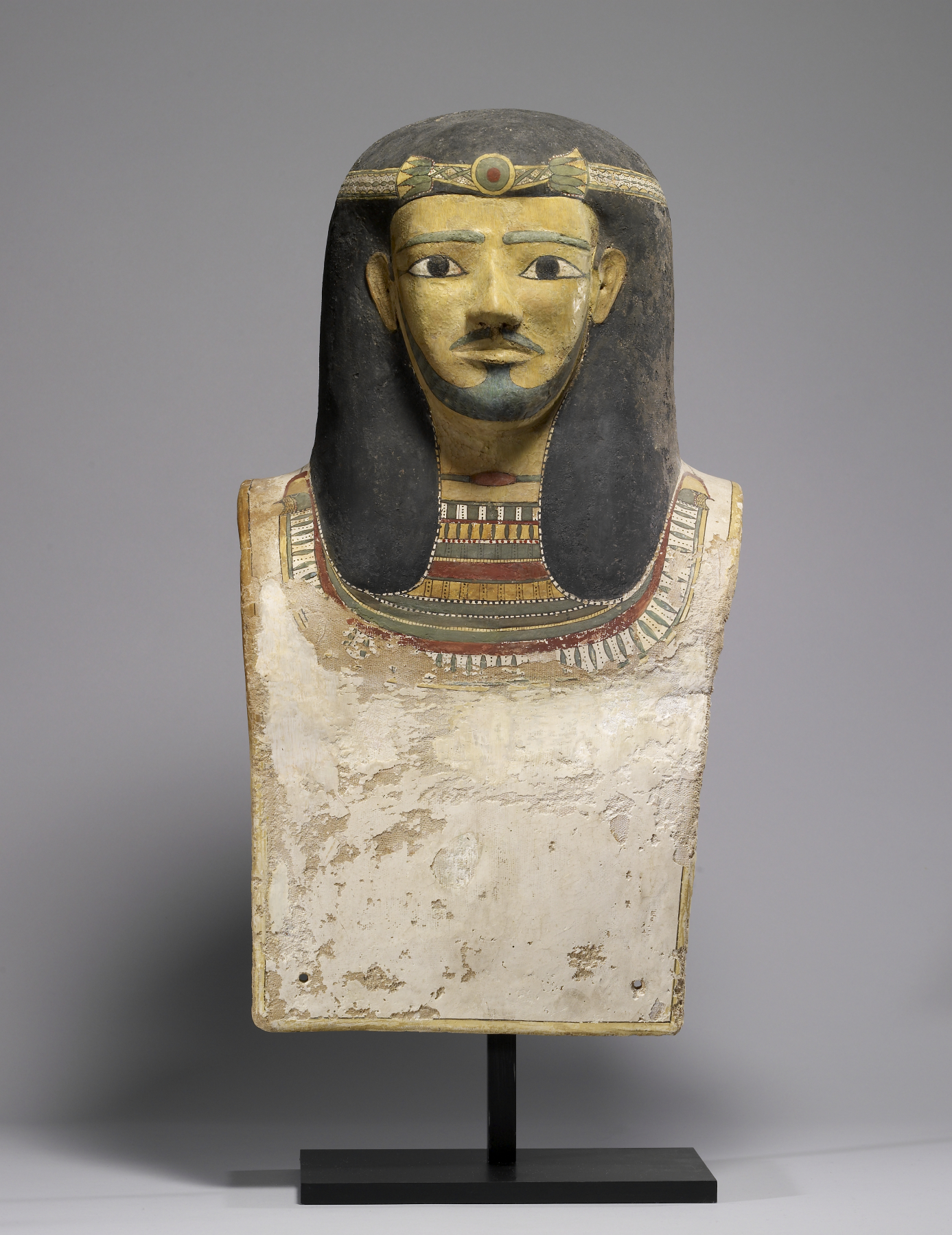

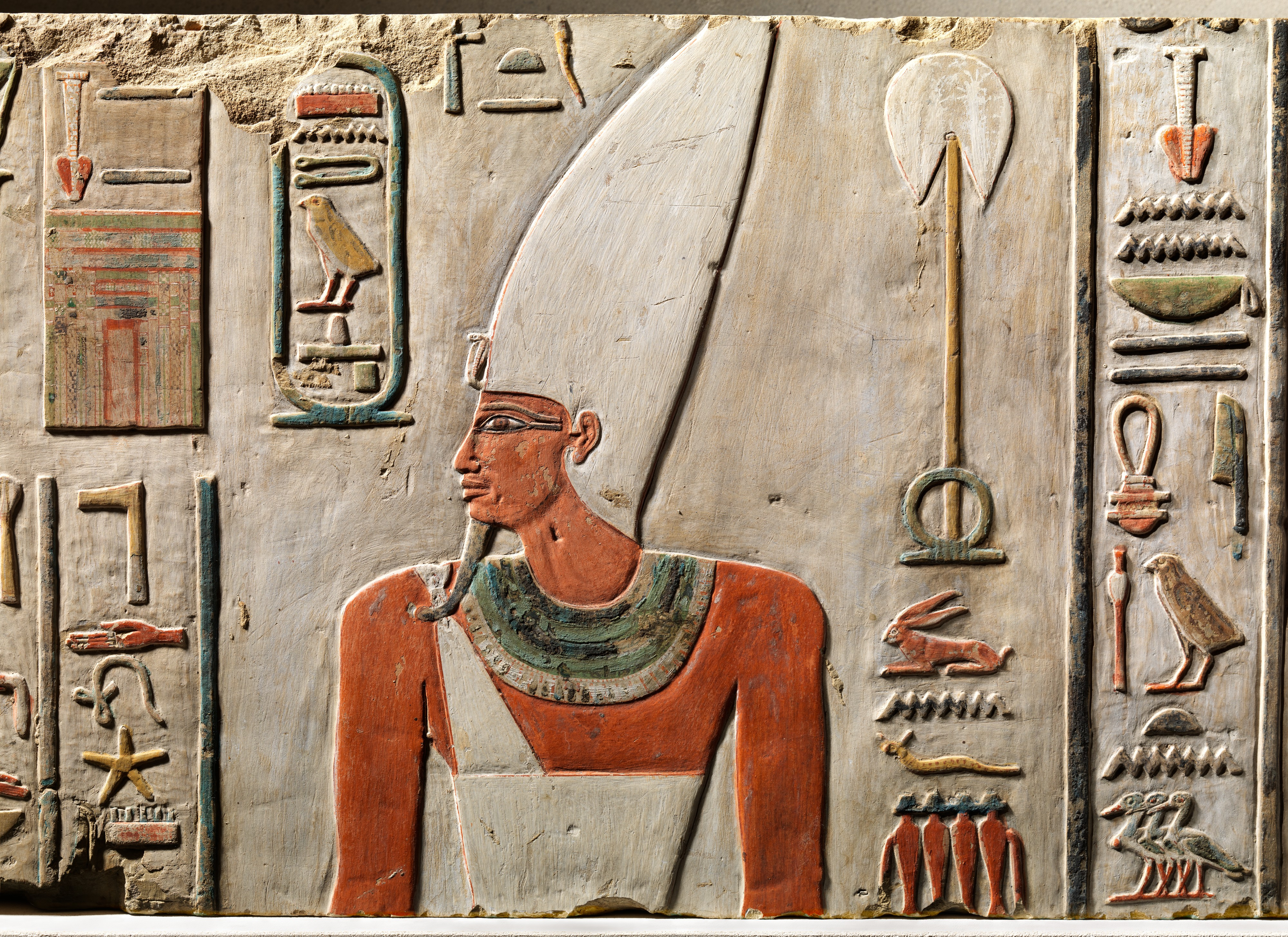

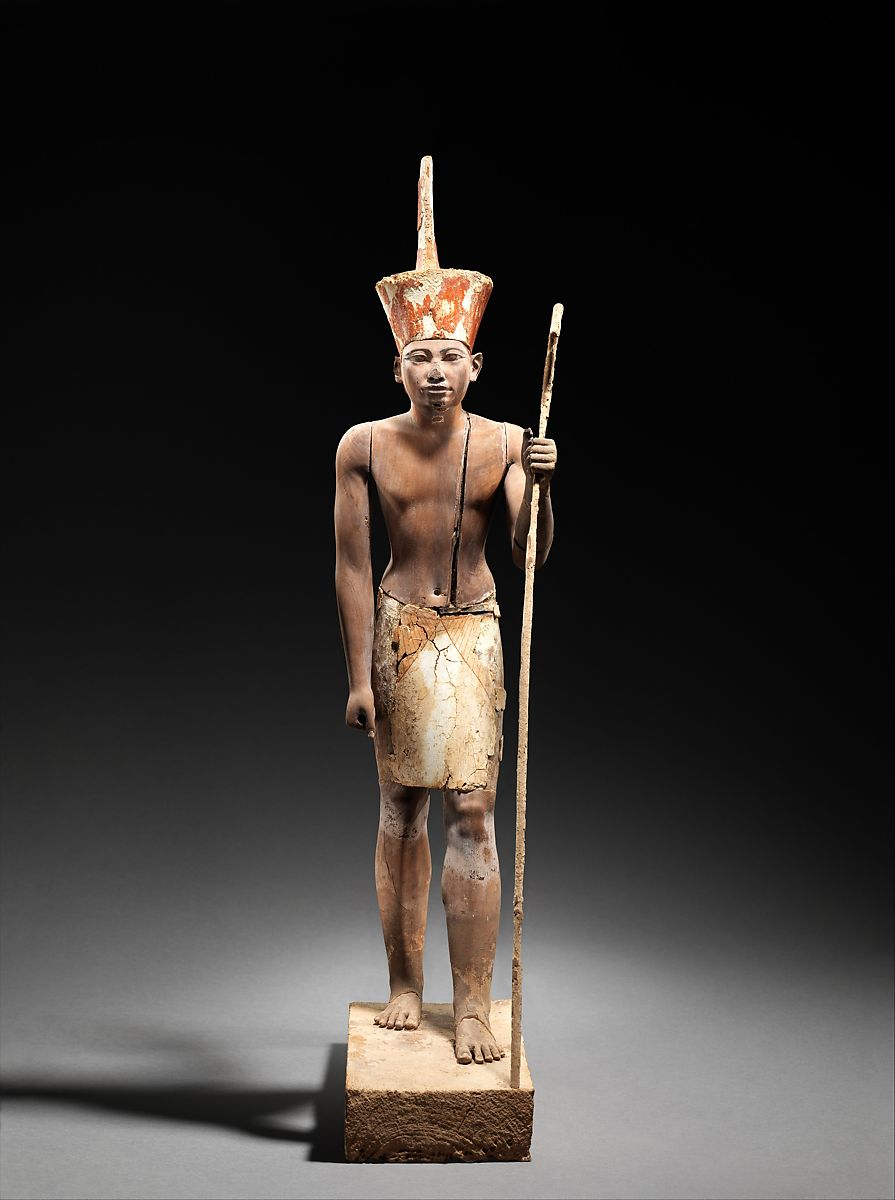
A figure wearing the red crown of Lower Egypt, most probably Amenemhat II or Senwosret II

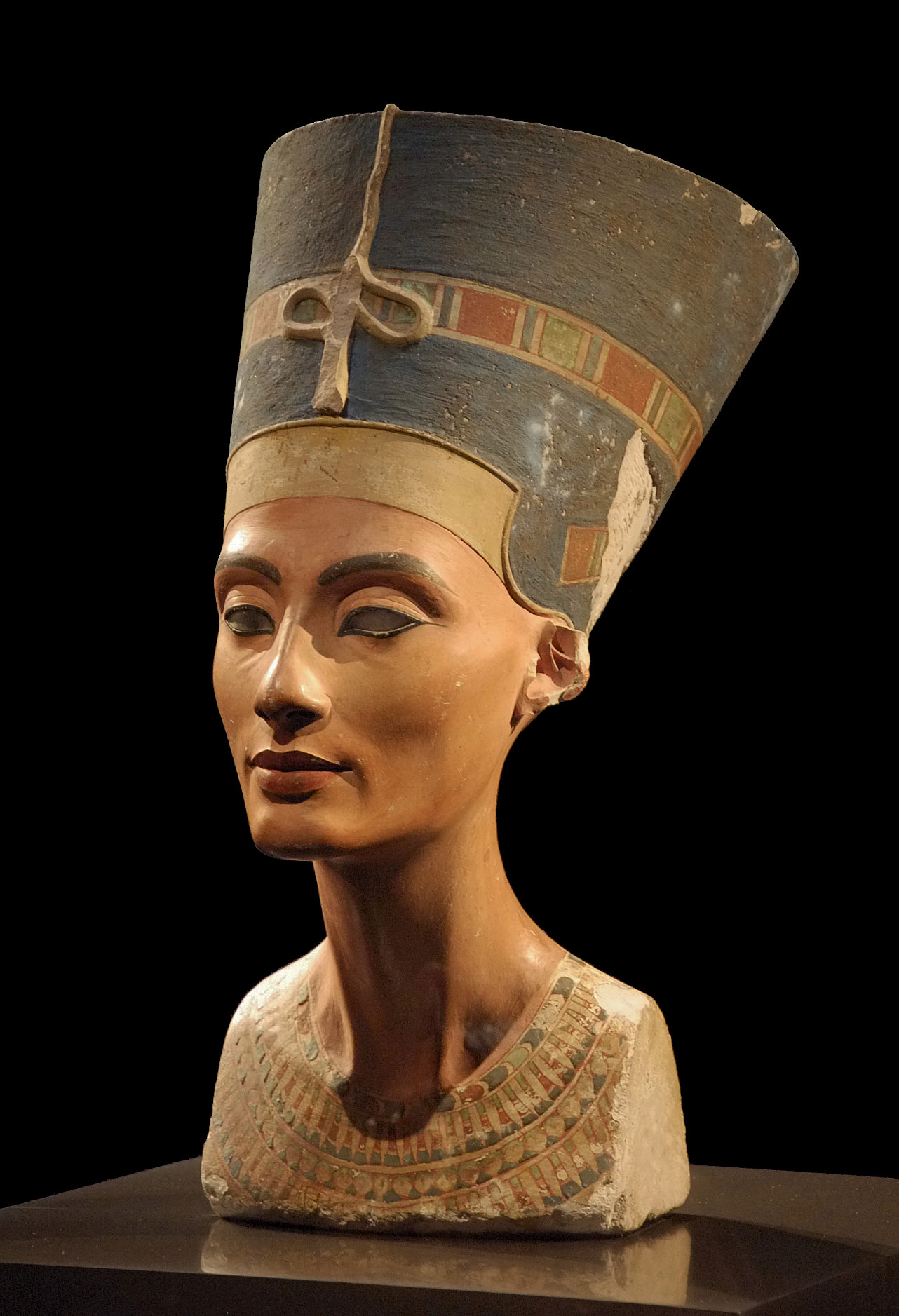
Nefertiti bust, from the 18th dynasty, New kingdom

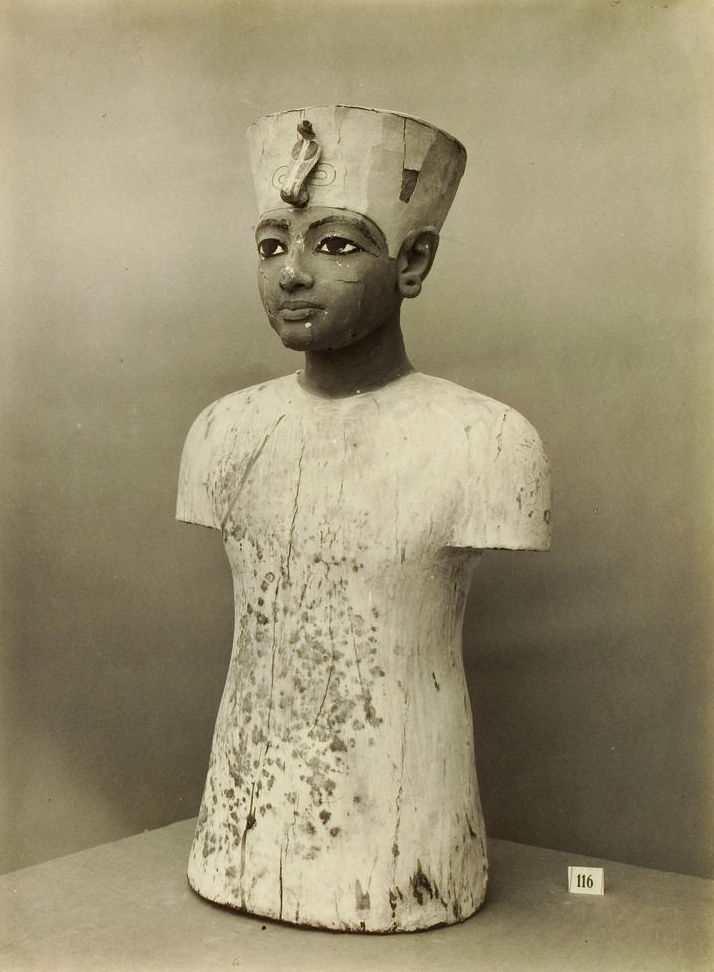
A painted, wooden figure of Tutankhamun found in his royal tomb

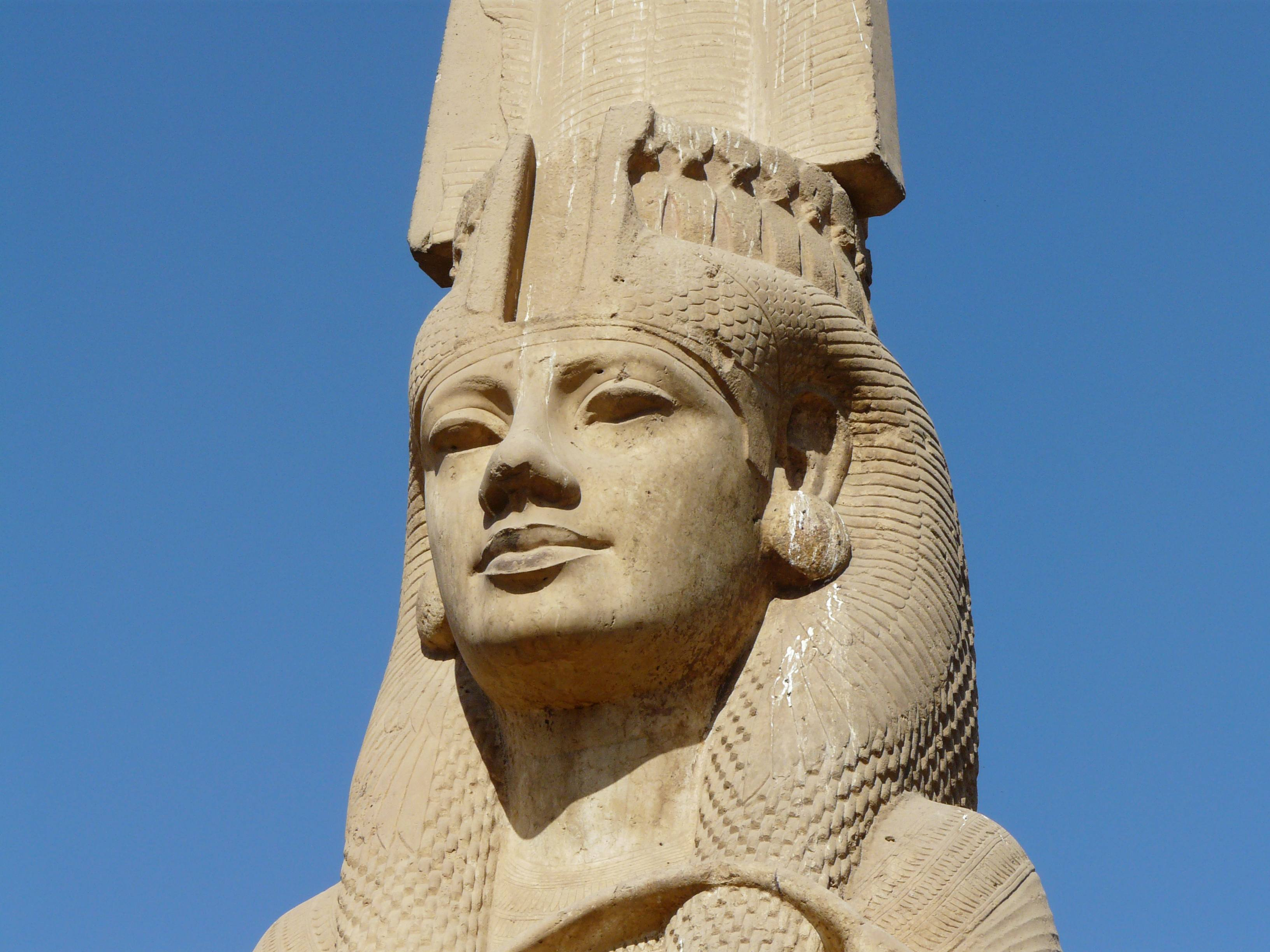
Portrait of Meritamun, 19th dynasty

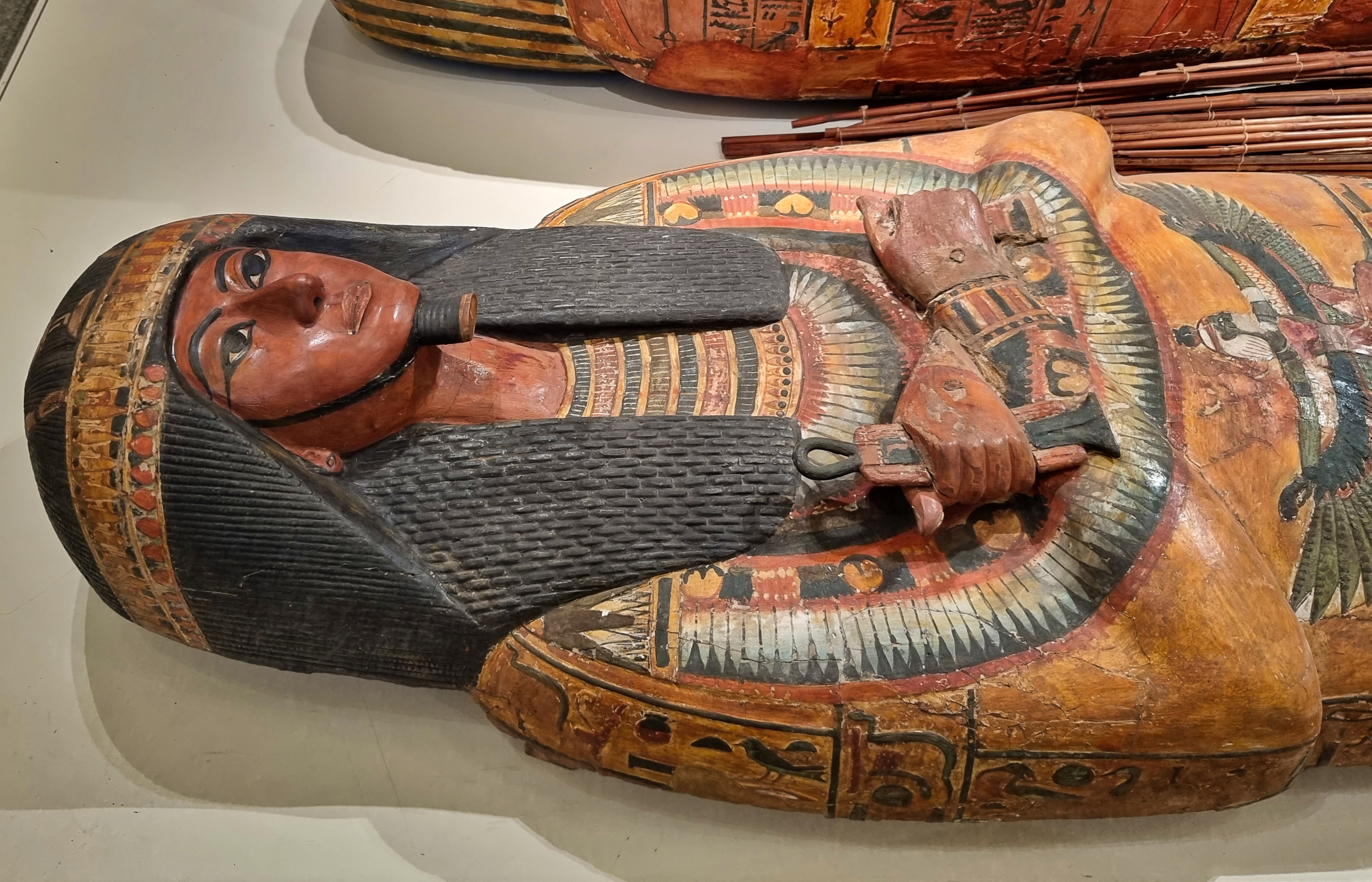
Sennedjem funerary mask 19th dynasty, Thebes, Egypt

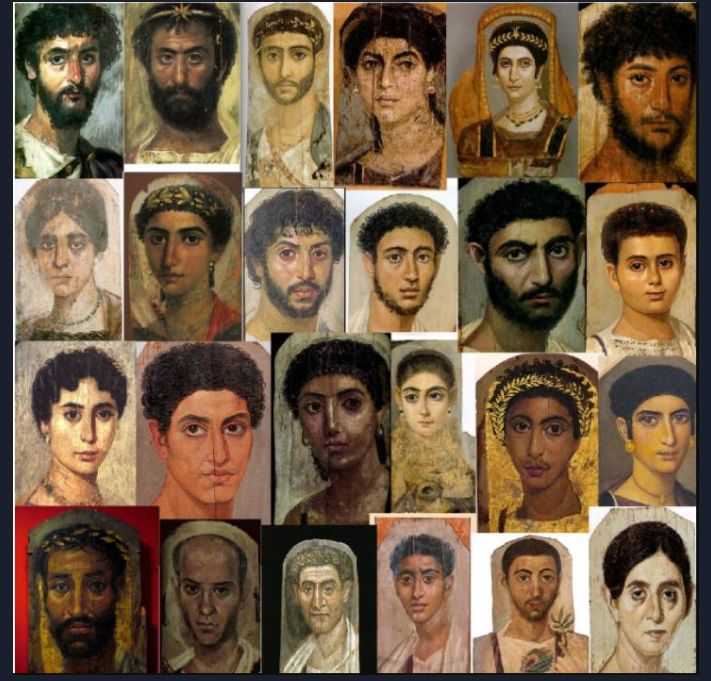
Greco-Roman Period Mummy portraits

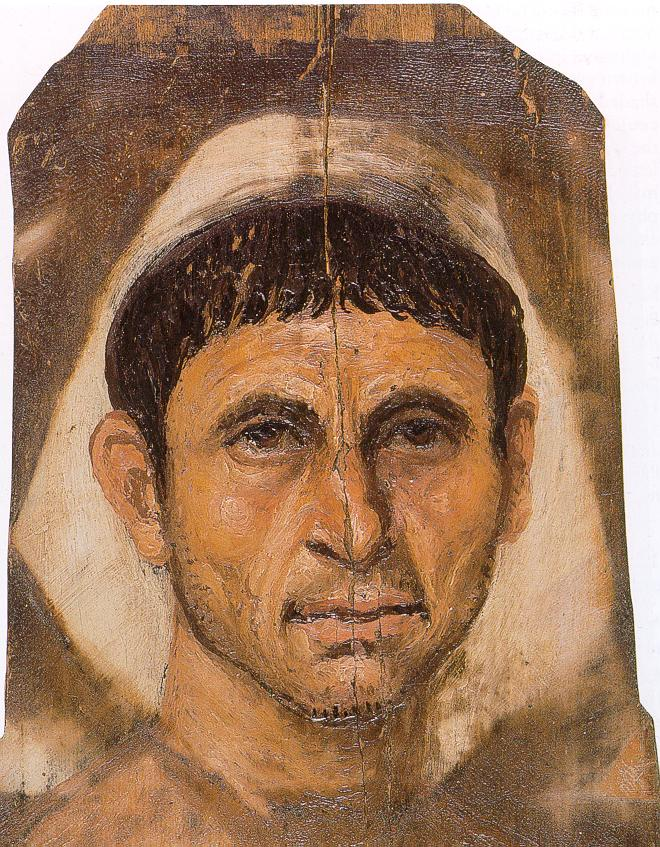

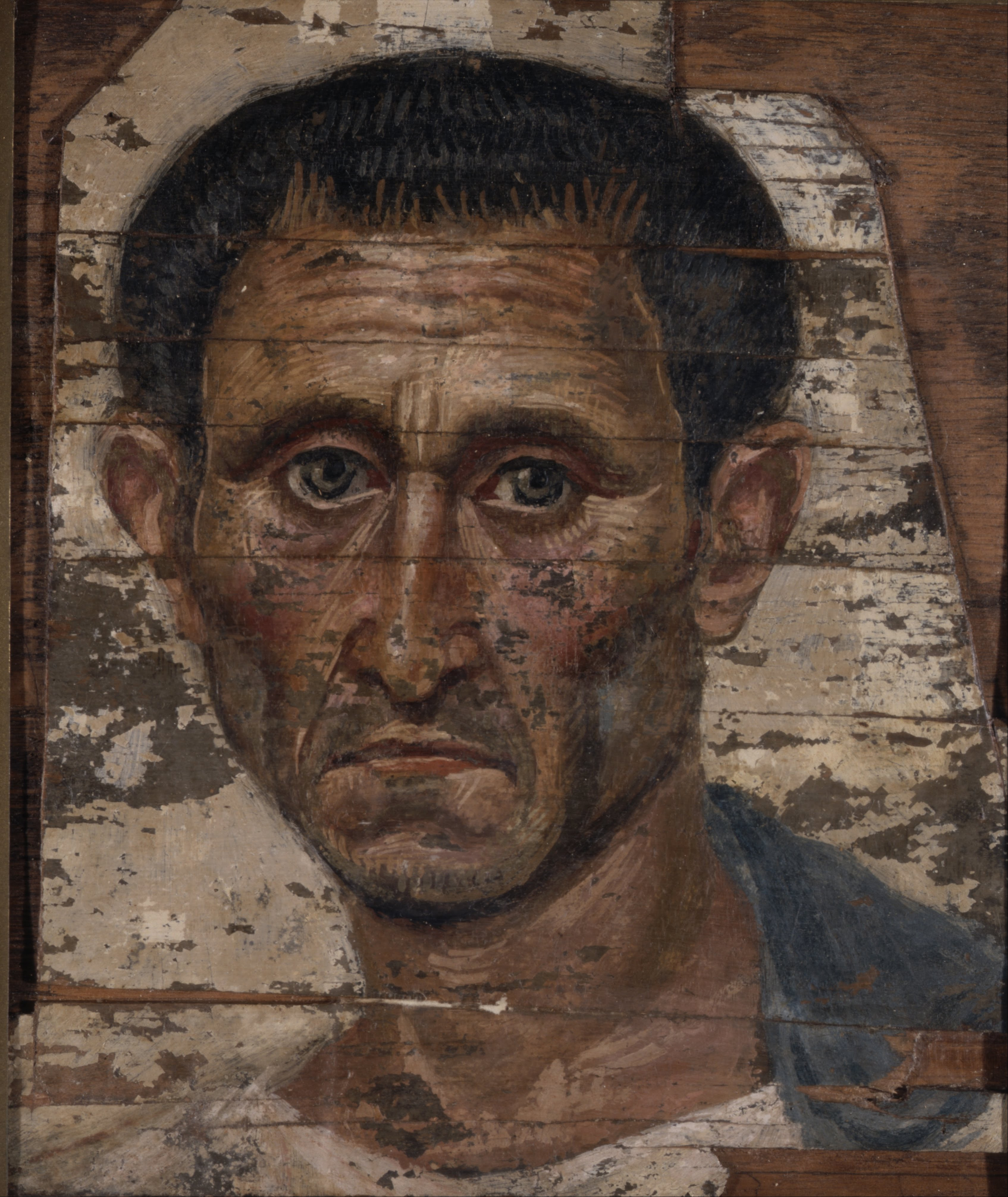

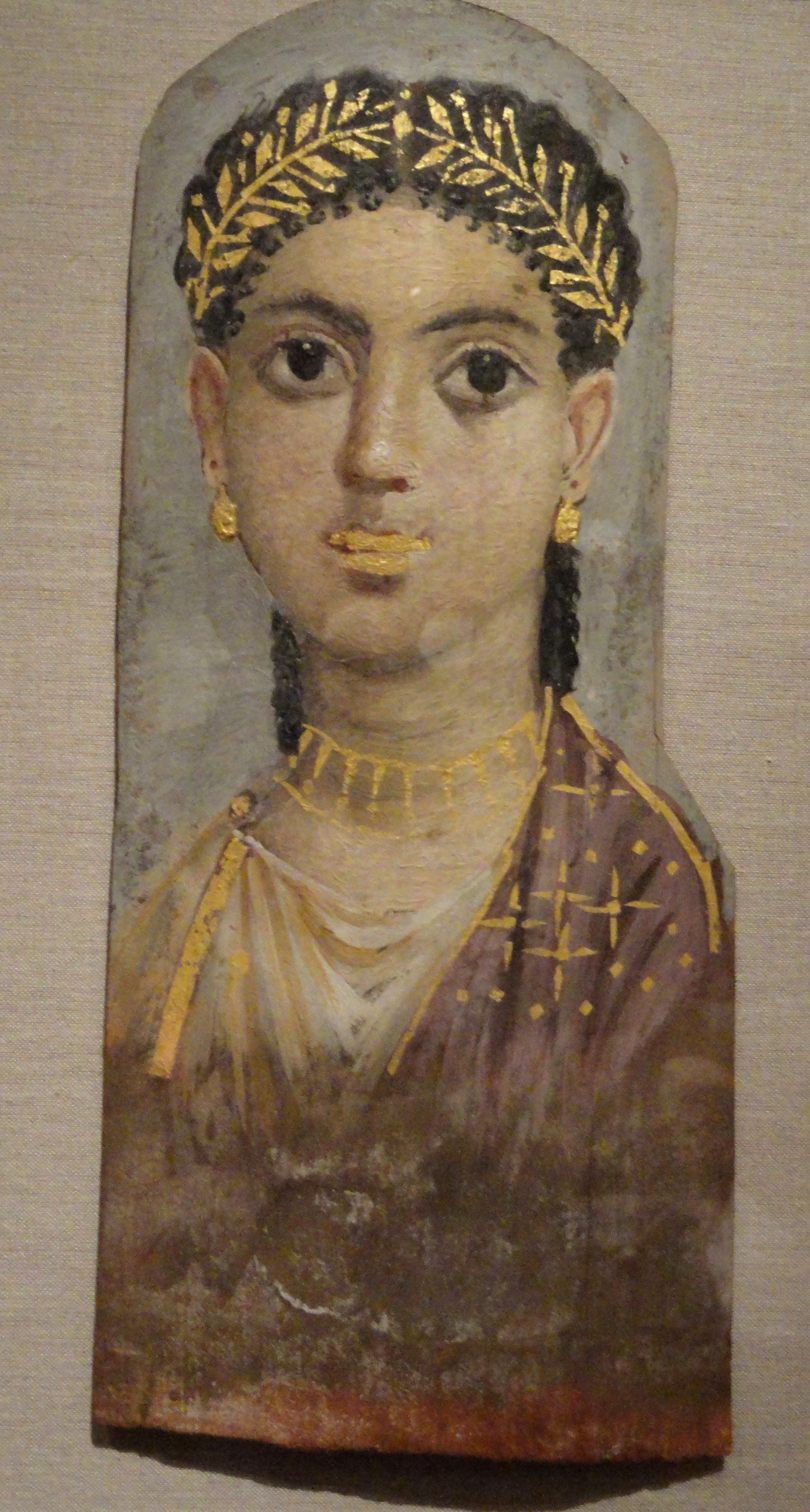

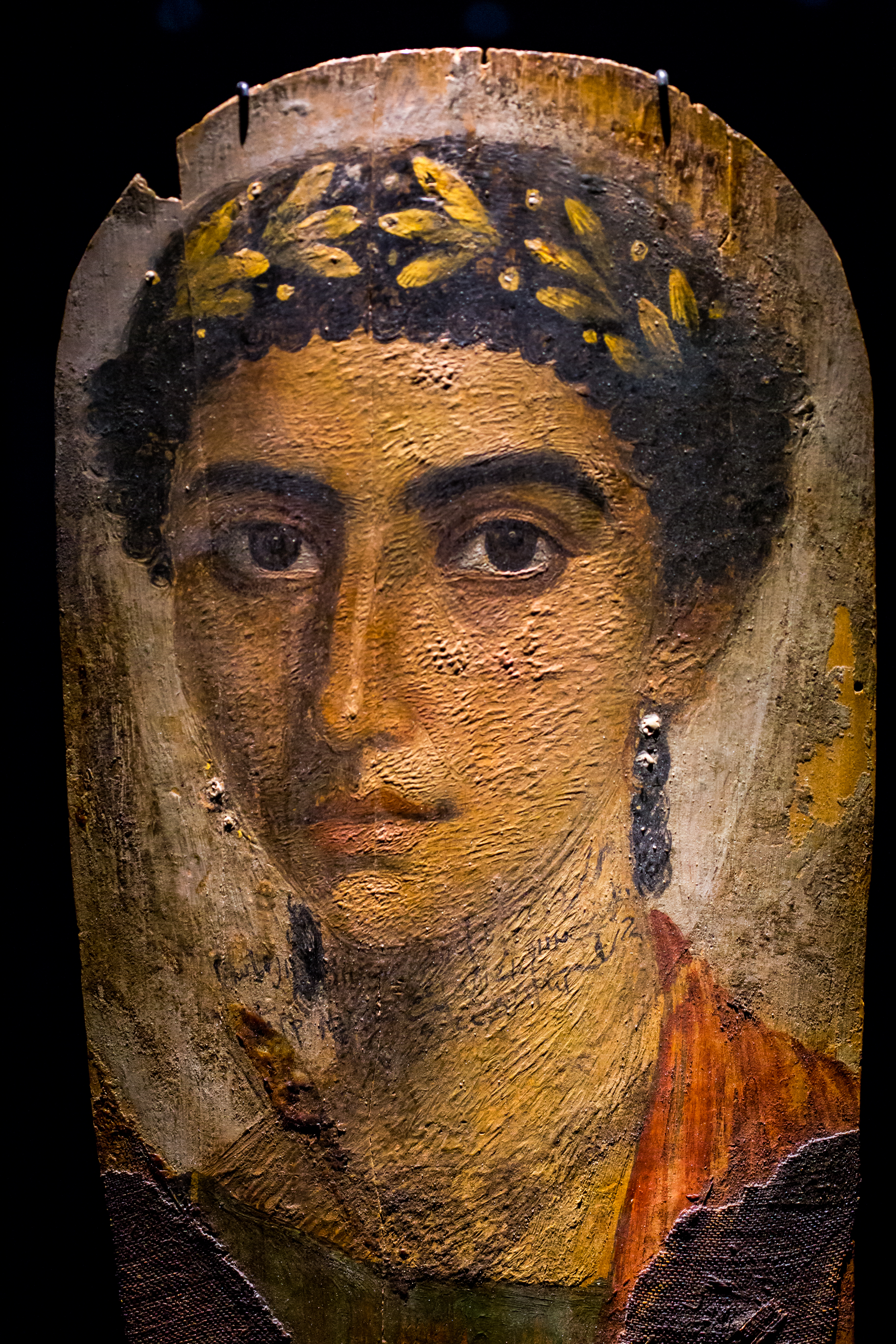

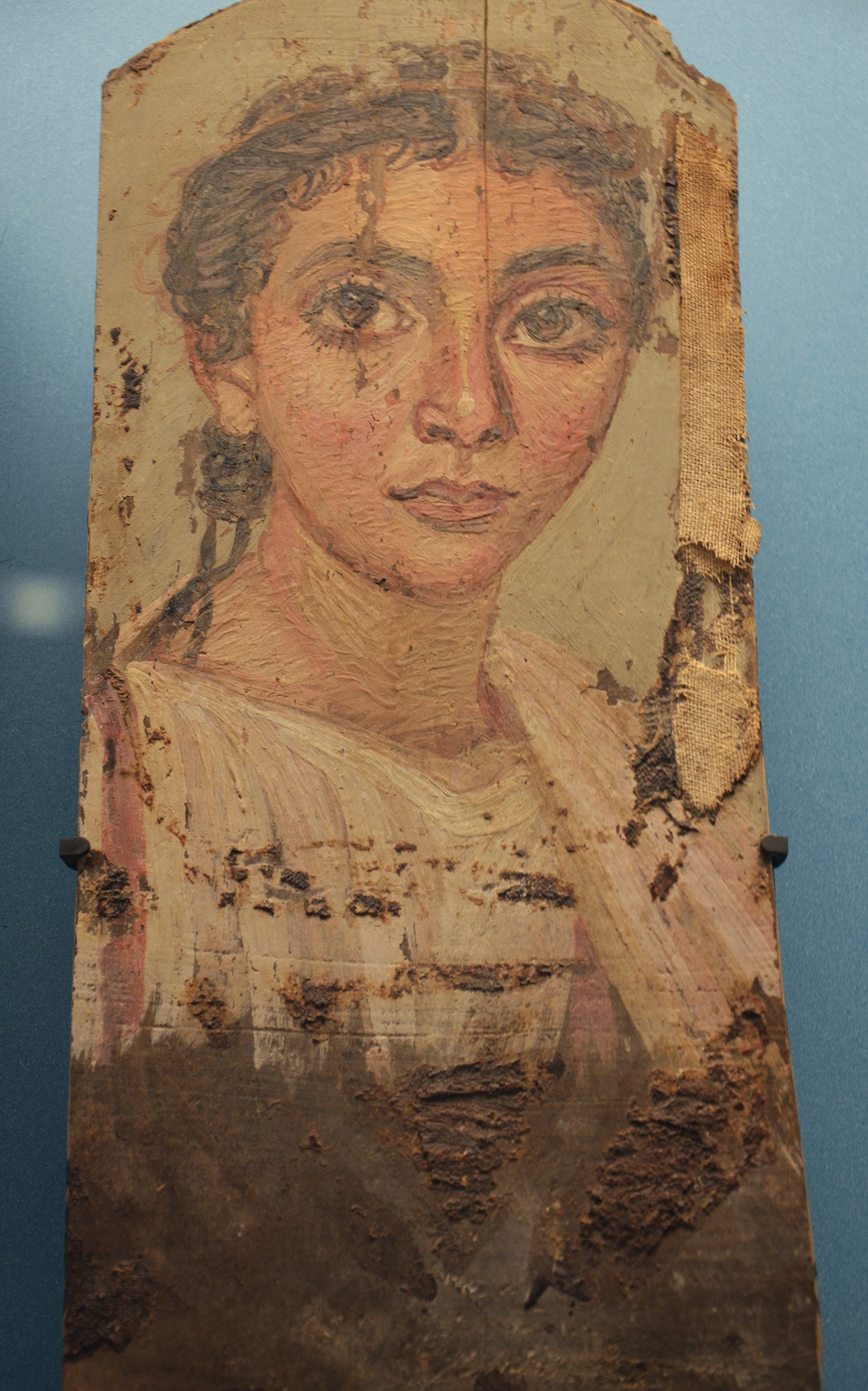

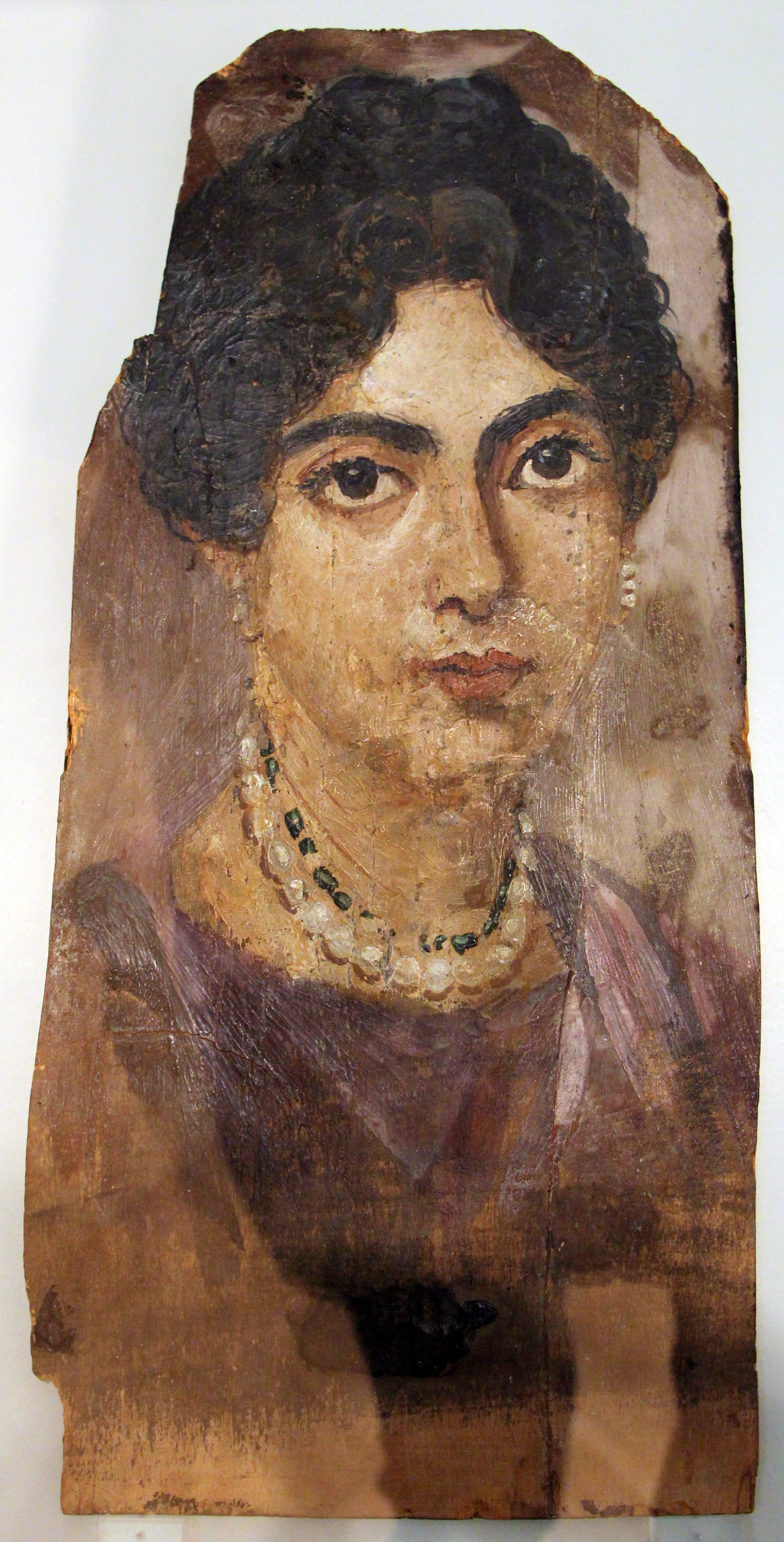

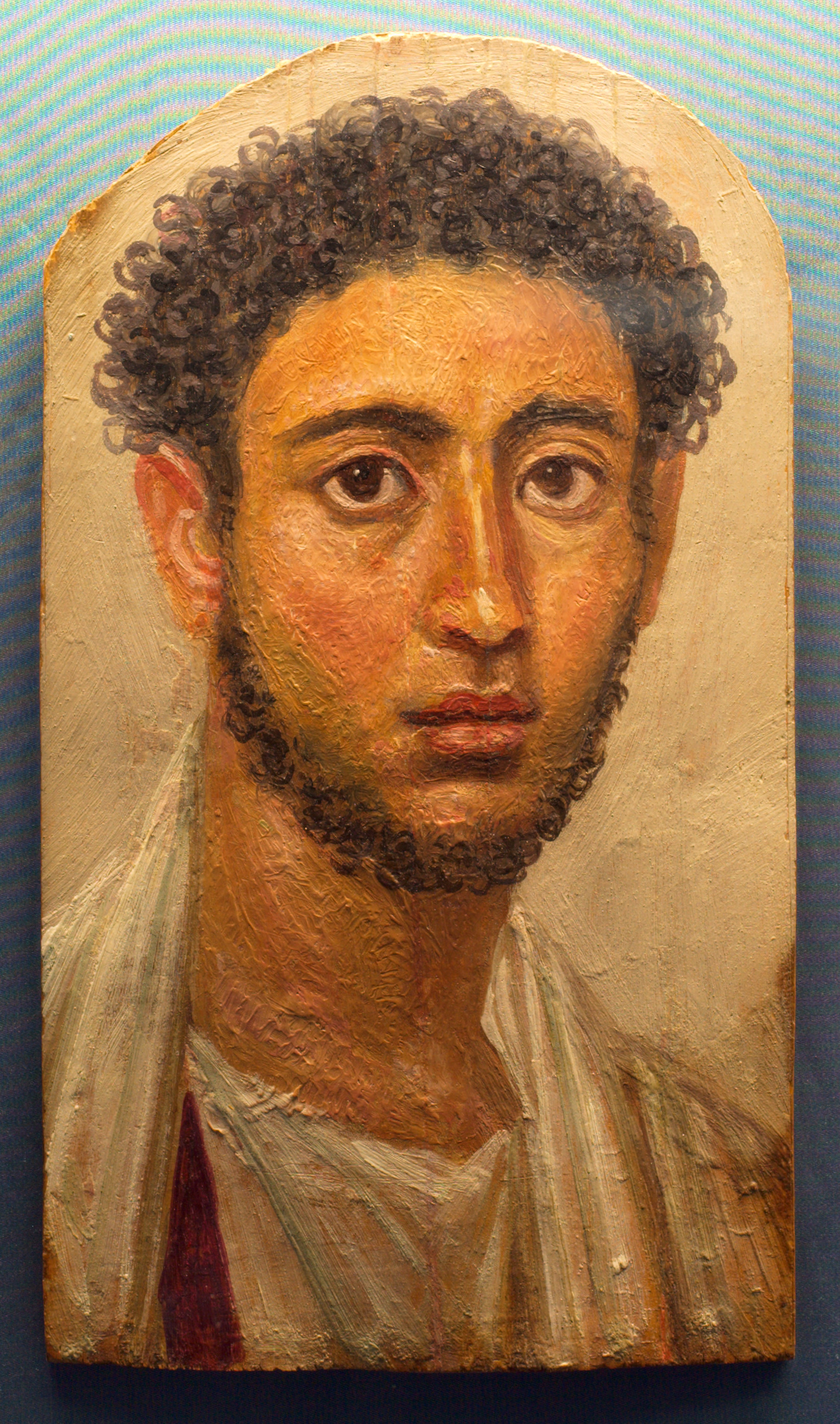

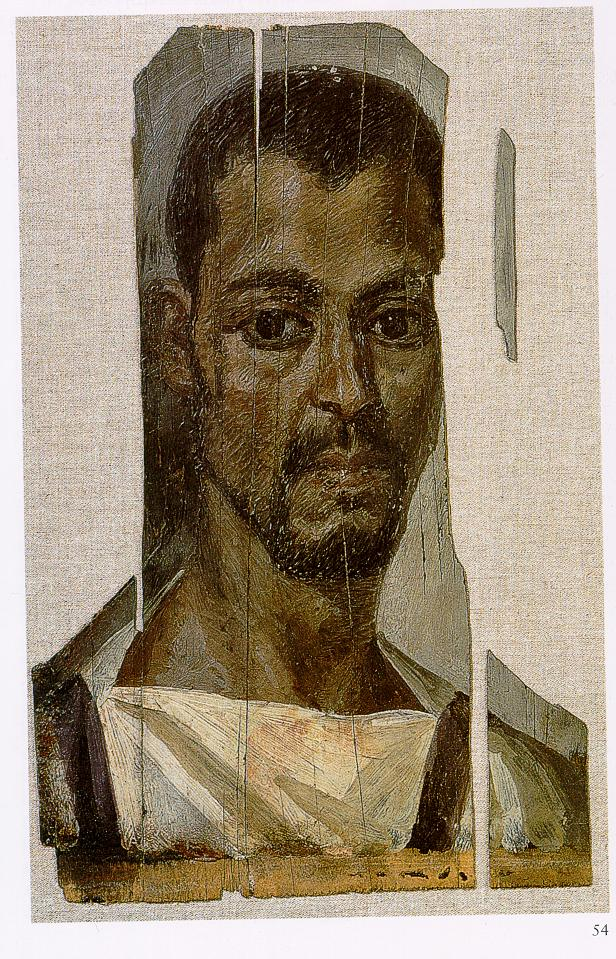

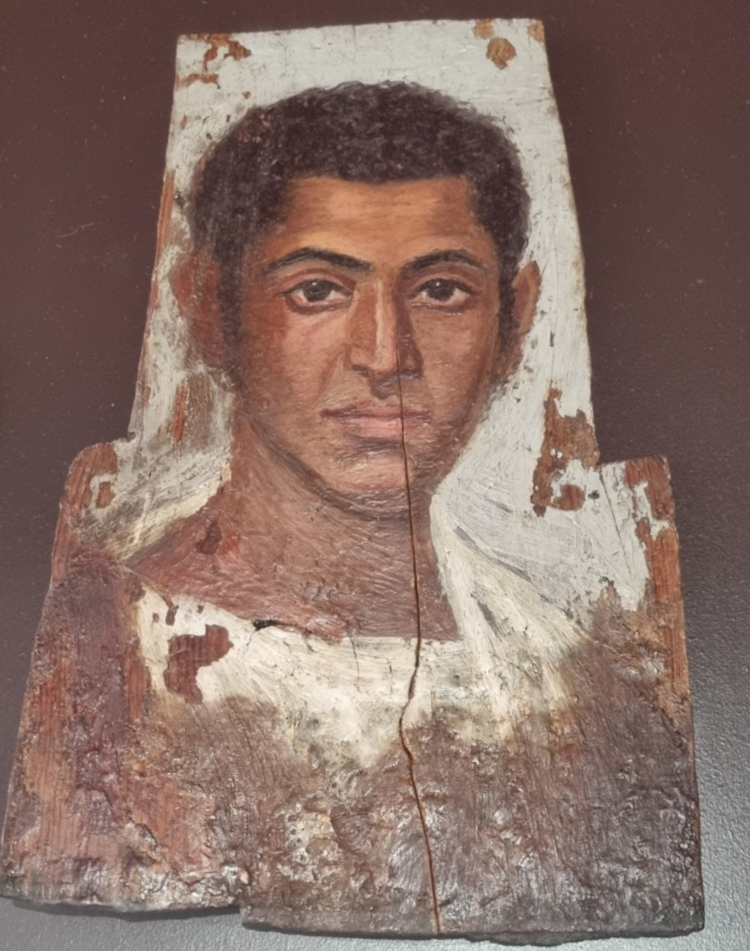

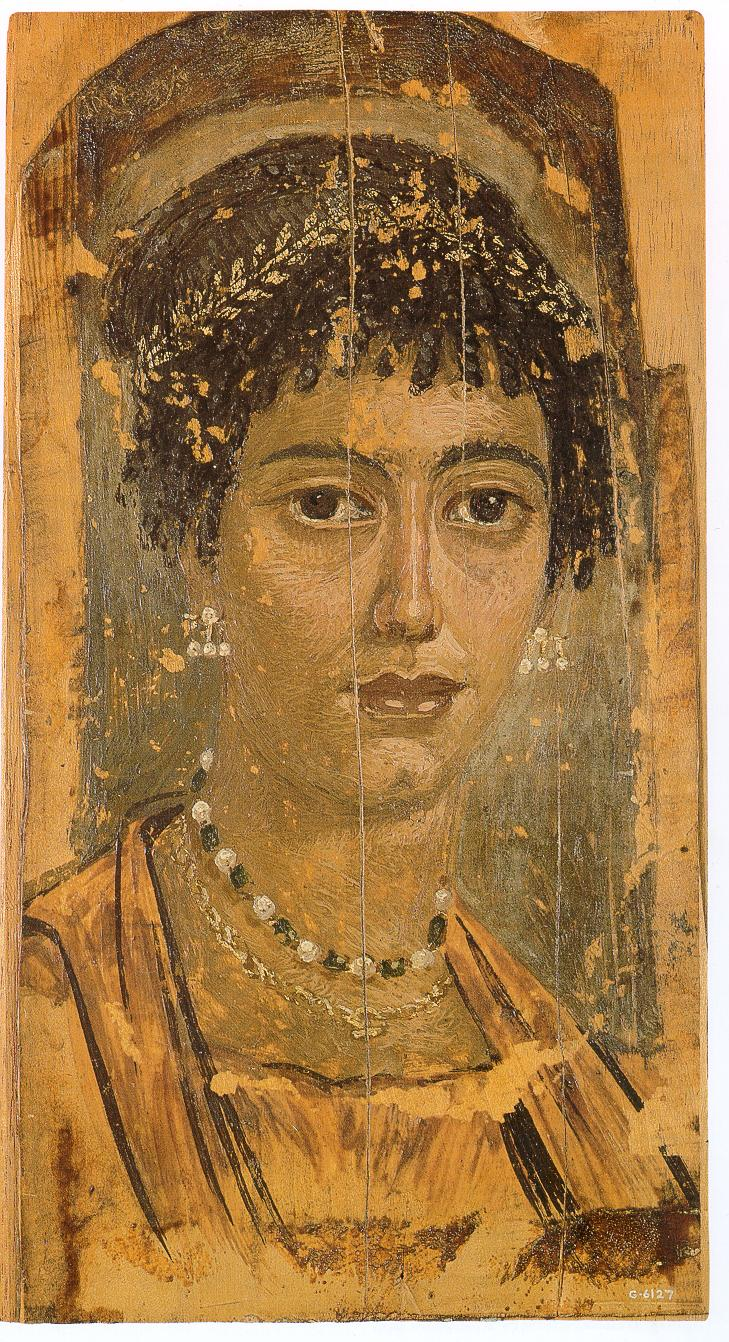

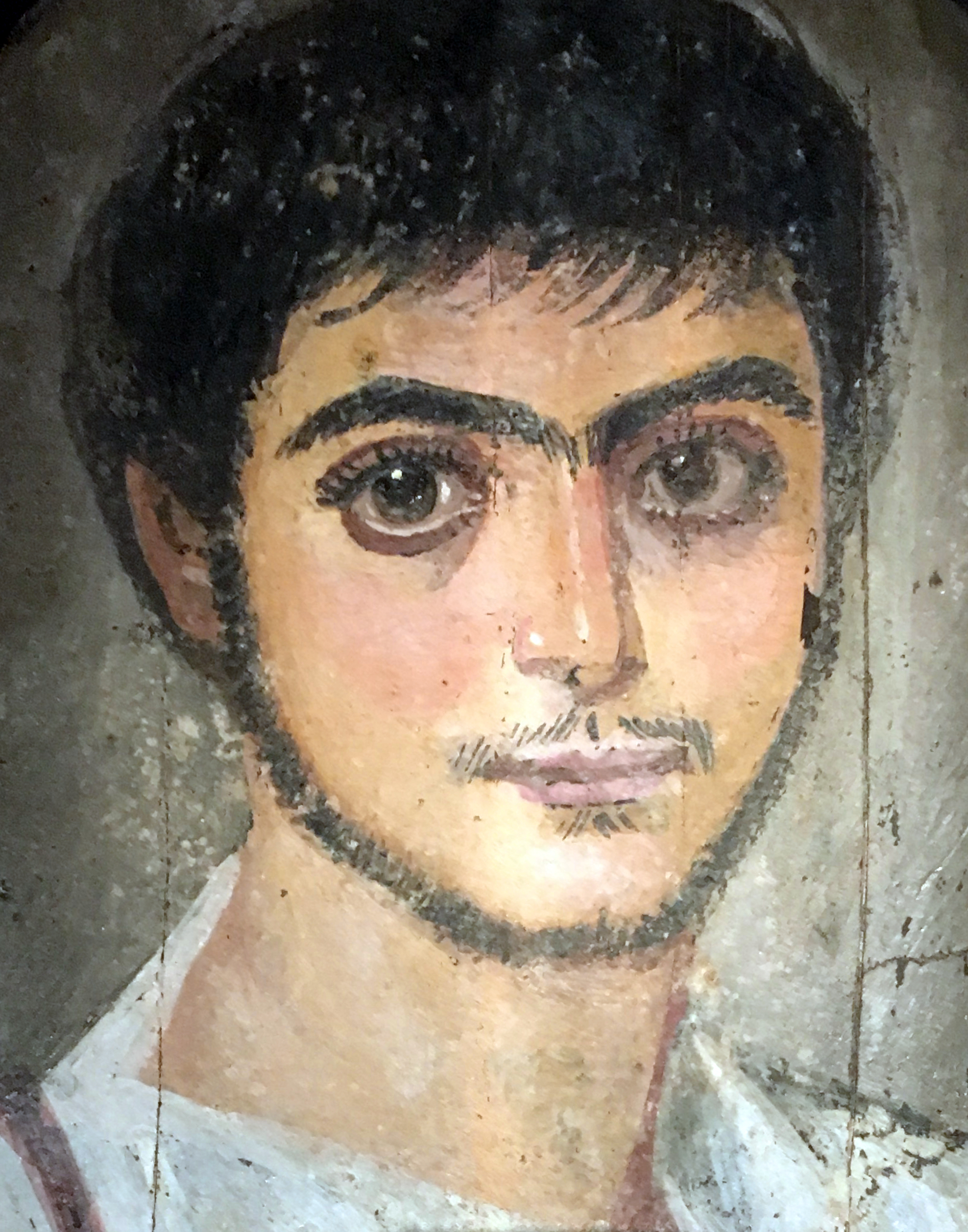

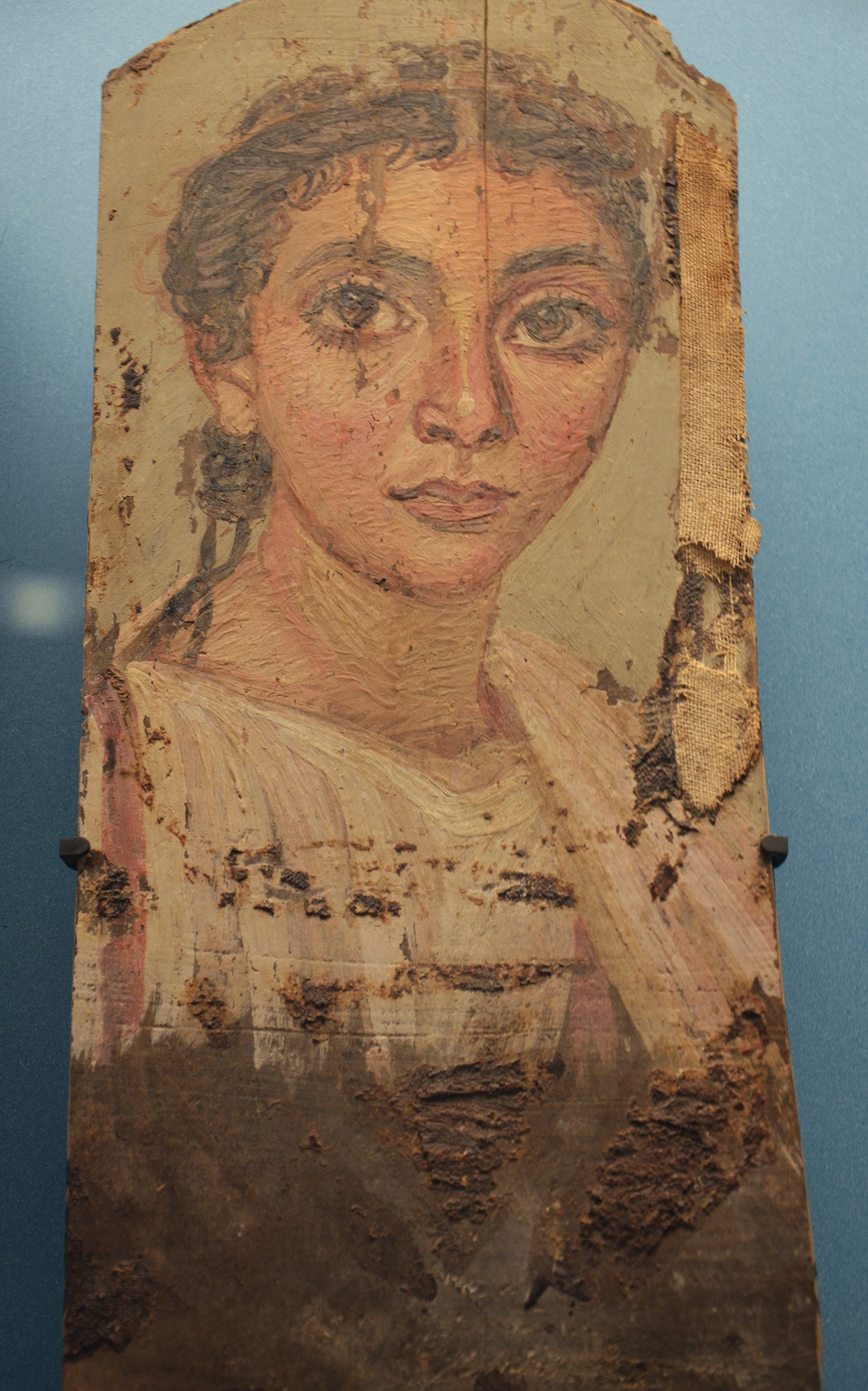

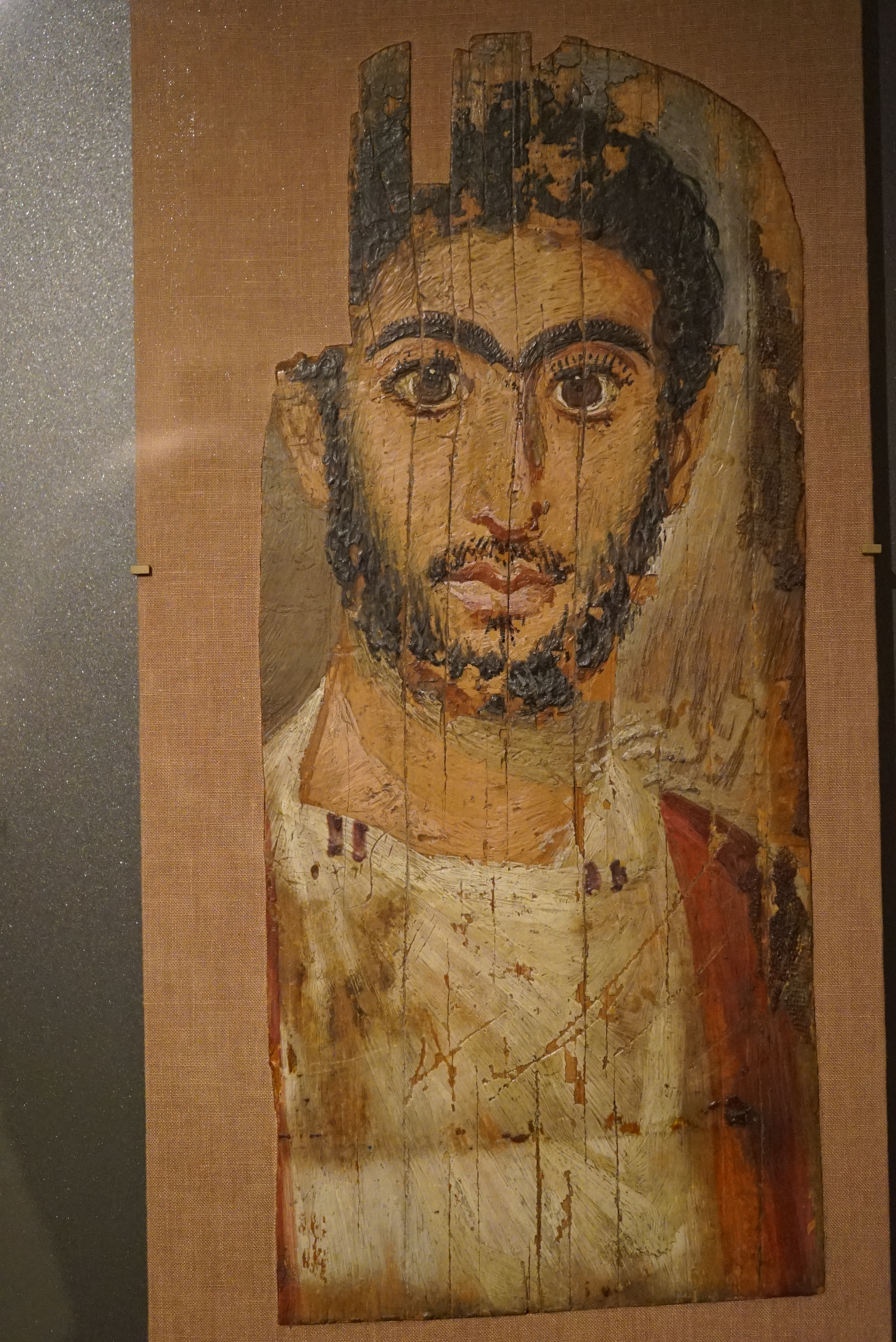

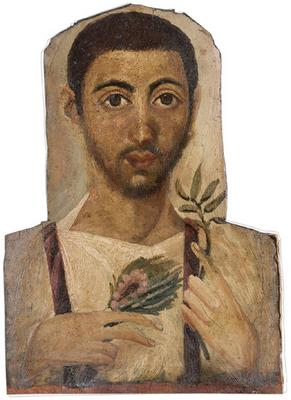

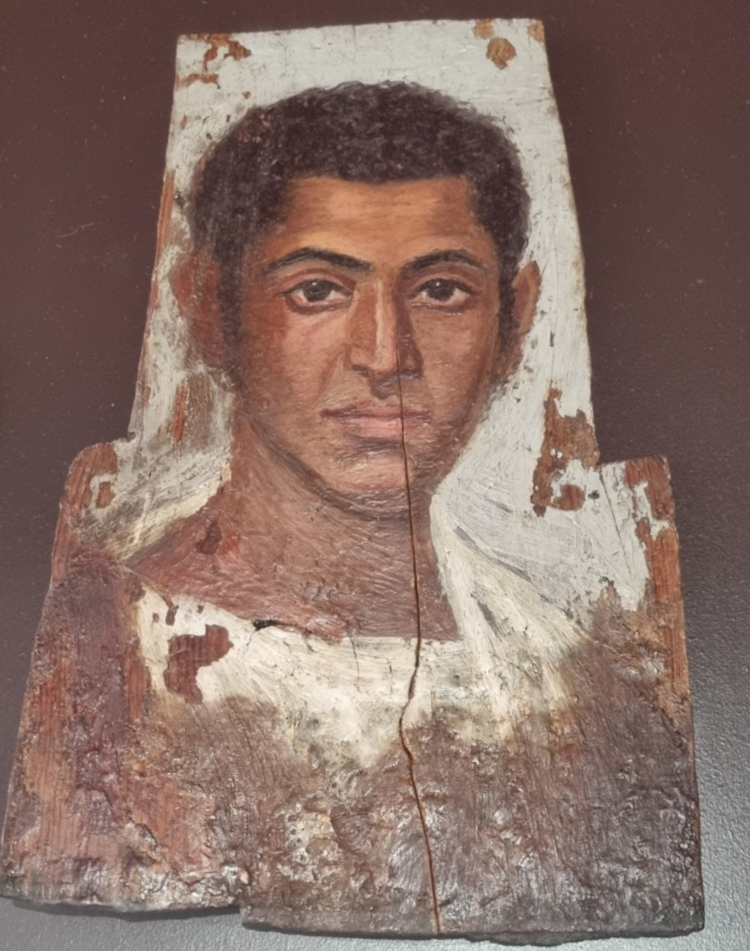

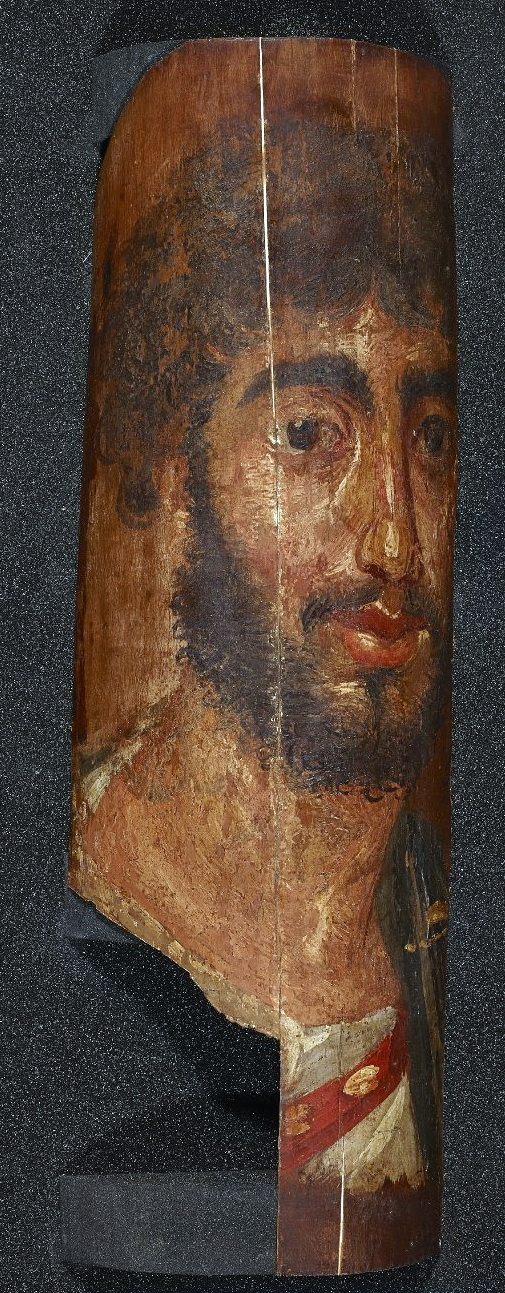

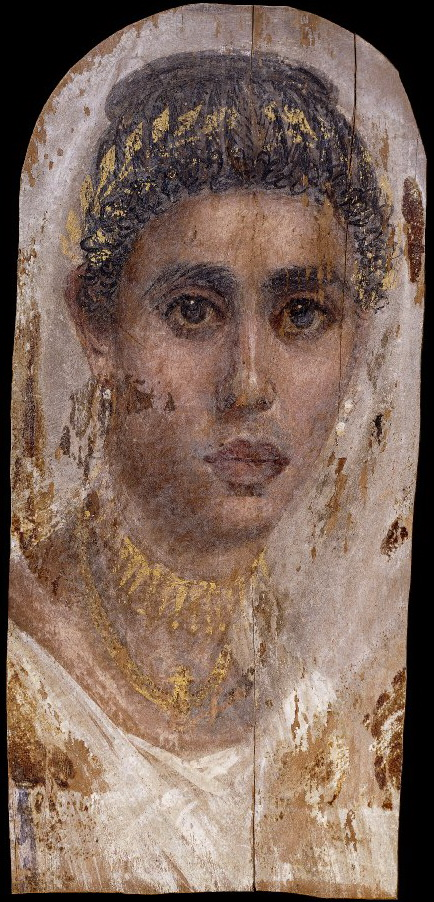

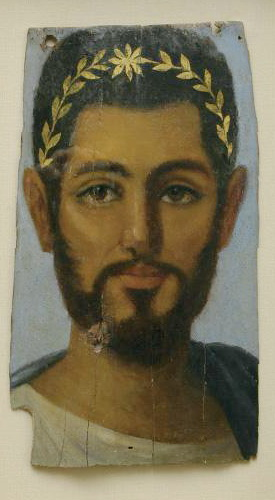

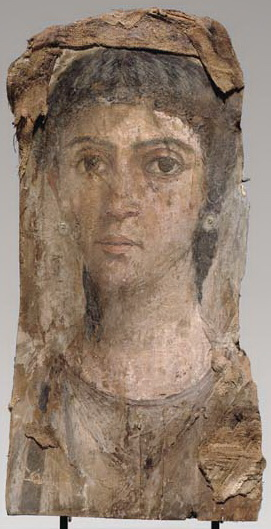

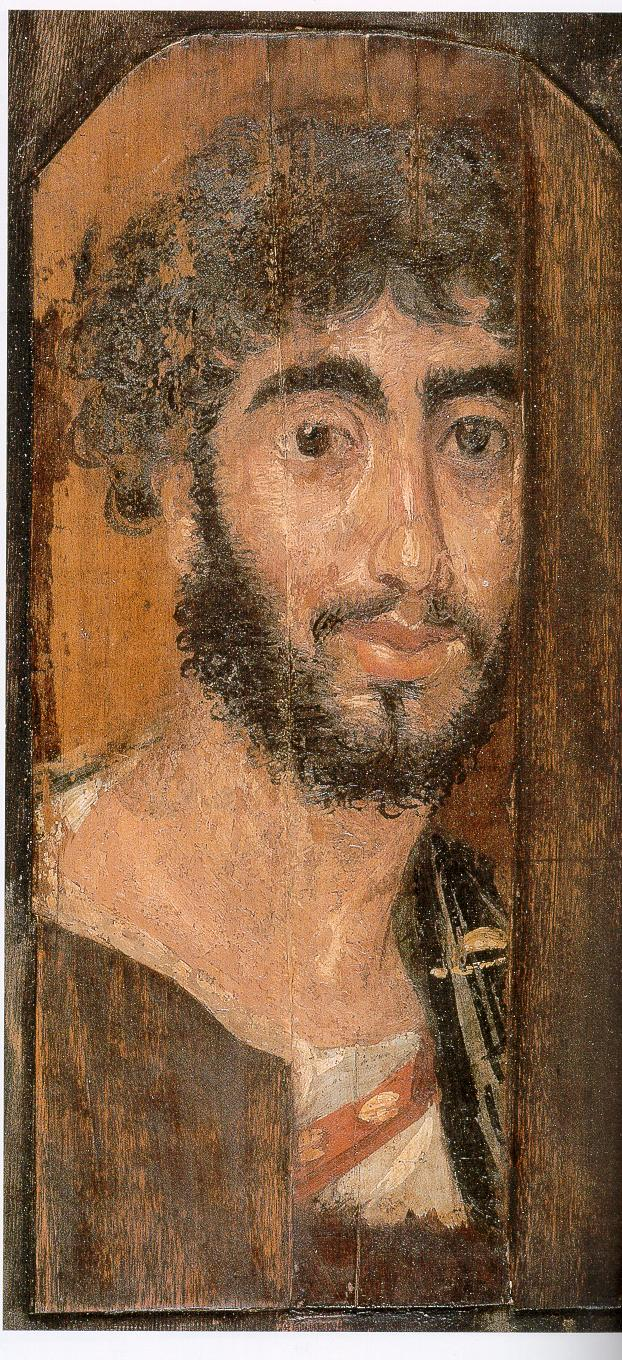

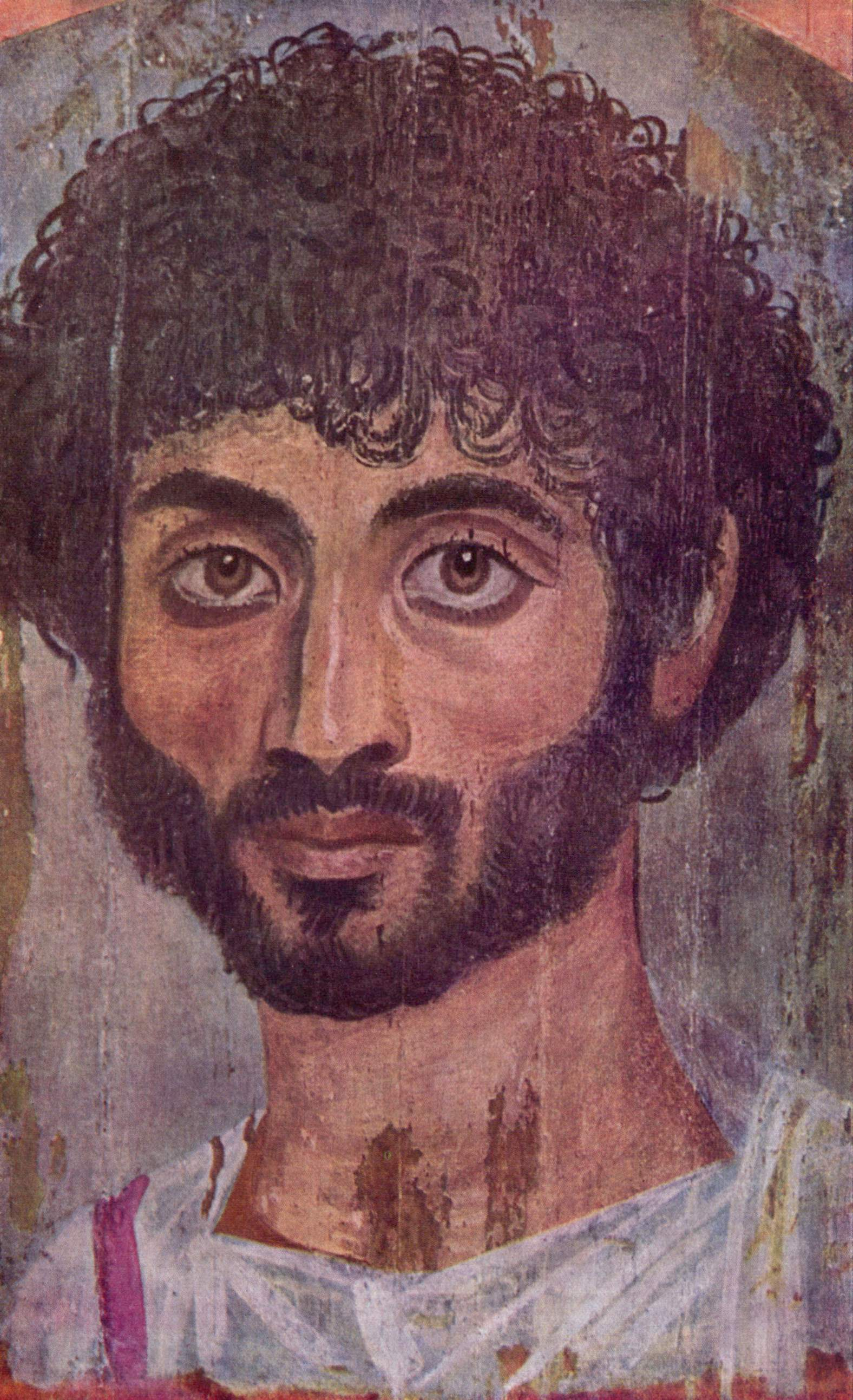
Fayum mummy portrait of man thin face and with curly hair at MET museum gallery 138

== See also ==
- Funerary art
- List of portraiture offerings with Ancient Egyptian hieroglyphs

== Sources ==
- Brewer, Douglas J. and Emily Teeter. Egypt and the Egyptians. 2nd. New York: Cambridge University Press, 2007. Print
- Mysliweic, Karol. Royal Portraiture of the Dynasties XXI-XXX. Mainz am Rhein: Verlag Philipp von Zabern, 1988.
- Spanel, Donald B. Through Ancient Eyes: Egyptian Portraiture. 2nd. Birmingham, Alabama: Birmingham Museum of Art, 1988.
