= Marc Erwin Babej =

German-American artist and writer

- Born: 1970 (age 55–56); Frankfurt, West Germany
- Education: Choate Rosemary Hall; Brown University; Columbia University Graduate School of Journalism
- Occupations: Photographic artist and writer
- Website: www.marcerwinbabej.com

Marc Erwin Babej (born 30 March 1970) is a German–American photographic artist and writer. His elaborately staged works focus on subject matter in history and social science.

== Life and career ==
Babej was raised in Bad Homburg, West Germany and graduated from Brown University (A.B., History, 1992) and Columbia University Graduate School of Journalism (MSc, 1993). He worked as a reporter Forbes Magazine, while also writing criticism for the arts sections of Corriere della Sera, Die Zeit, Die Weltwoche and The Guardian.

== Works ==
Babej's photography-based series focus on conflicting belief systems in history, politics and science. Mask of Perfection (2013) examined the tensions between natural beauty and the "scientific" approach to beauty practiced in plastic surgery.

His subsequent works have examined the after-effects of historical events such as the collapse of the Soviet Union in Chernogirls and the Roman heritage of Tunisia in Africanae.

Mischlinge (2014) focuses on the impact of the Nazi era on definitions of national identity in the Federal Republic of Germany, combining images with genealogical DNA tests of the cast members and writings by himself, historian Thomas Kühne and Cem Özdemir, co-chairman of Alliance '90/The Greens.

Unser Afrika (2015) focuses on supremacy and colonial genocide during, and in the aftermath of, the Herero and Namaqua genocide in the former colony of German Southwest Africa. Historians and genocide scholars Henning Melber, Jürgen Zimmerer, Ulrich van der Heyden and Joachim Zeller served as historical advisors on the work. The June 2018 premiere of Unser Afrika in Hamburg City Hall was widely regarded as having drawn attention to an overlooked aspect of German history.

=== Style ===
Babej works exclusively in black and white. His photographic style is influenced by the deep focus cinematography of 1930s and 40s filmmakers such as Orson Welles and Jean Renoir, and cinematographer Gregg Toland. Mischlinge explicitly references the aesthetics of Leni Riefenstahl.

=== Yesterday – Tomorrow ===
Babej's latest work, Yesterday – Tomorrow: A Work in Aspective Realism, takes up the complex visual language of ancient Egyptian art. An international team of more than 50 specialists was involved in the work. Thirteen Egyptologists worked with Babej as co-creators of the "photographic reliefs" which form the core of the work: Christian Bayer and Oliver Gauert (Roemer- und Pelizaeus-Museum Hildesheim), Laurel Bestock (Brown University), Peter Der Manuelian (Harvard University), Roxana Flammini (Pontifical Catholic University of Argentina/CONICET), Salima Ikram and Mariam Ayad (American University in Cairo), Christian Loeben (Museum August Kestner), Juan Carlos Moreno García (Université Paris IV-Sorbonne), Matthias Müller ( University of Basel) Thomas Schneider (University of British Columbia), Regine Schulz (LMU Munich) and Steve Vinson (Indiana University Bloomington). The preface of the Yesterday – Tomorrow book is written by his mentor, Roger Ballen.

=== Aspective Realism ===
In Yesterday – Tomorrow, Babej adapts defining characteristics of ancient Egyptian art, such as aspective representation (the simultaneous representation of the human body from multiple perspectives in two-dimensional media), the canon of proportions and the integration of images, symbols and text.

The resulting new art style, termed Aspective Realism, is regarded as "the revival of ancient Egyptian art after 2,000 years of dormancy." At the opening of the Yesterday – Tomorrow exhibition at the Egyptian Museum in Cairo, Head of the Museums Sector at Egypt's Ministry of State of Antiquities, Elham Salah, stated that Aspective Realism "revives the complex visual language of ancient Egyptian art and evolves it in contemporary photorealistic media."

== Selected exhibitions ==
- 2018: Yesterday – Tomorrow, Egyptian Museum, Cairo, Egypt
- 2018: Unser Afrika, Hamburg City Hall, Germany
- 2018: Yesterday – Tomorrow, Bibliotheca Alexandrina, Egypt
- 2017: Yesterday – Tomorrow, Roemer- und Pelizaeus-Museum Hildesheim, Germany
- 2016: Mischlinge, Paris Photo, Paris
- 2016: Mischlinge, Museum Wewelsburg, Germany
- 2015: Mischlinge, Historical Technical Museum, Peenemünde
- 2015: Mask of Perfection, Paris Photo, Paris
- 2015: Mischlinge", Galerie m2a, Dresden, Germany
- 2015: Chernogirls, AB Gallery, Lucerne, Switzerland
- 2014: Mask of Perfection, Paris Photo, Paris
- 2014: Mask of Perfection, Clarinda Carnegie Art Museum, Clarinda, Iowa
- 2014: Körpereingriffe/Mask of Perfection, Lebensspuren Museum, Wels, Austria
