= Book of the Dead of Nehem-es-Rataui =

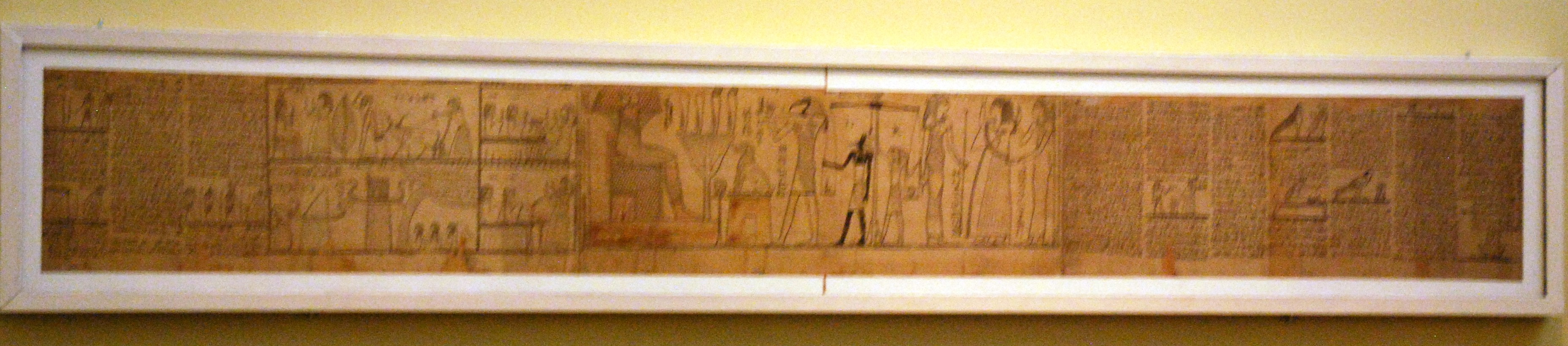
Full view of the surviving papyrus

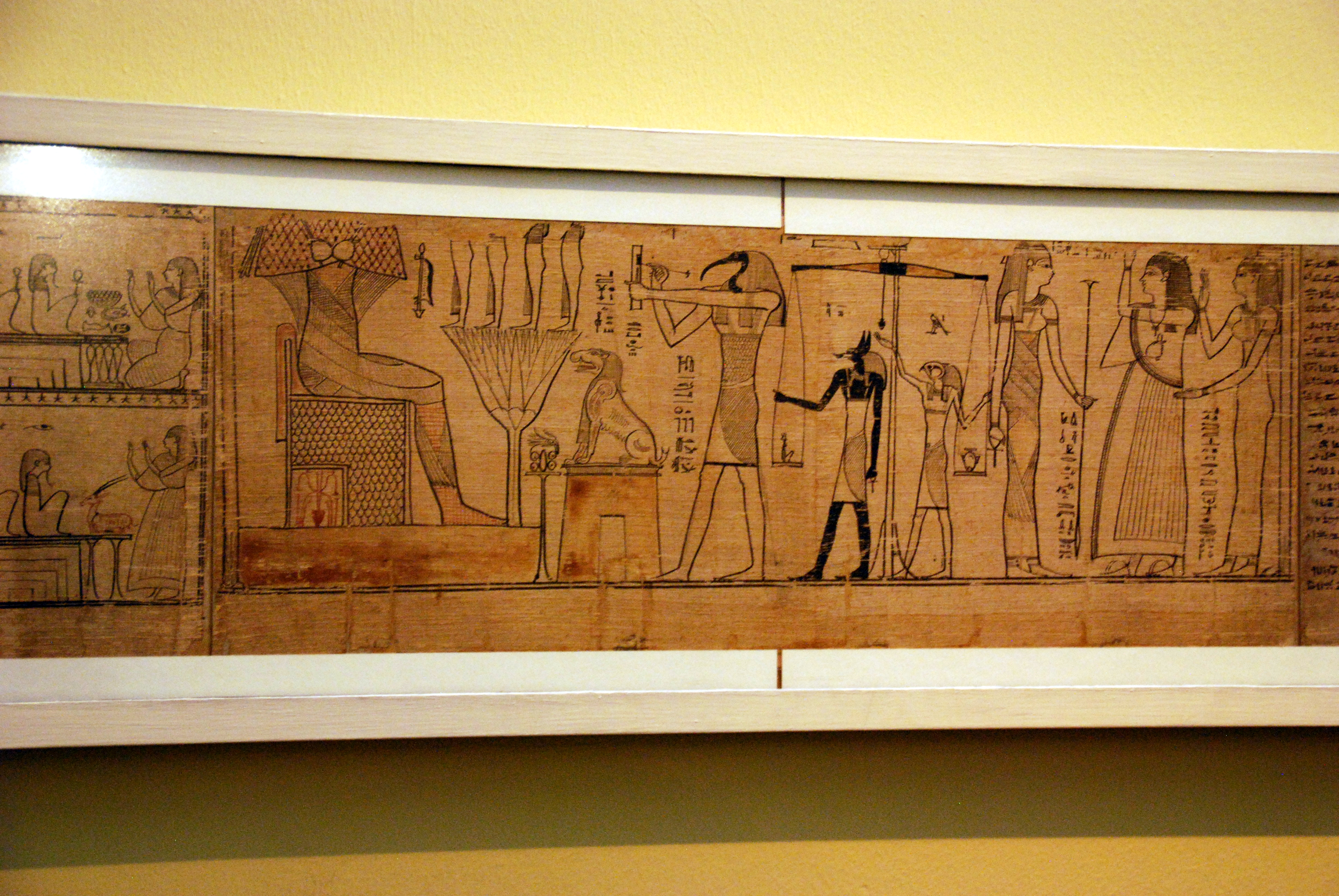
Judgement of the dead

The Book of the Dead of Nehem-es-Rataui is, along with the Papyrus Brocklehurst, the most important papyrus in the collection of the Museum August Kestner in Hanover, Germany. It contains one of the many traditional versions of the Egyptian Book of the Dead, which differs most significantly from similar papyri in the style of the central scene of the Judgement of the dead.

The papyrus was part of the collection of August Kestner and is now located in the Museum August Kestner in Hanover (inventory number 3454), where it is displayed in Room II of the Egyptological collection with other gravegoods and artefacts from the death cult.

The book derives from Thebes and is dated to the Ptolemaic period, probably around 200 BC. The papyrus was among the grave goods of the Singer of Amun, Nehem-es-Rataui. The Papyrus was written in Hieratic script, completely in black ink. Originally the 21 centimetre high document had a length of 715 centimetres - that is, 15 pages. As a result of damage in the Second World War, when the central city of Hanover was bombed and the Kestner Museum took heavy damage, it only survives in the form of three fragments with a length of 1.64 m, which includes the central scene. The very tight combination of the important Egyptian deities in the central scene is notable. Osiris sits in judgement, Anubis and Horus weigh the heart of the deceased, Thoth records the result and the monstrous Ammit waits to devour the ba of the deceased in the event of a negative judgement. On a lotus bloom between Osiris and Thoth stand the four sons of Horus. The deceased is at the right, accompanied by two goddesses. At other points, the text is broken up by small images, mostly of the Horus falcon. Another large image is located to the left of the main image, divided into four smaller images.

== Bibliography ==
- Günter Burkard, Hans-Werner Fischer-Elfert: Ägyptische Handschriften. Vol. 4 (= Verzeichnis der orientalischen Handschriften in Deutschland Vol. 19, 4). Steiner, Stuttgart 1994, p. 214, n. 316.
- Hans-Georg Dettmer: „… den Sinn für das Schöne erwecken …“. Führer durch das Kestner-Museum Hannover. Kestner-Museum Hannover, Hannover 1998, ISBN 3-924029-28-8, pp. 63–65.
- Christian E. Loeben: Die Ägypten-Sammlung des Museum August Kestner und ihre (Kriegs-)Verluste. Leidorf, Rahden 2011, ISBN 978-3-86757-454-9, p. 181.
