= Minoan sarcophagus (Hanover) =

Artifact from the Minoan civilization

Minoan Sarcophagus
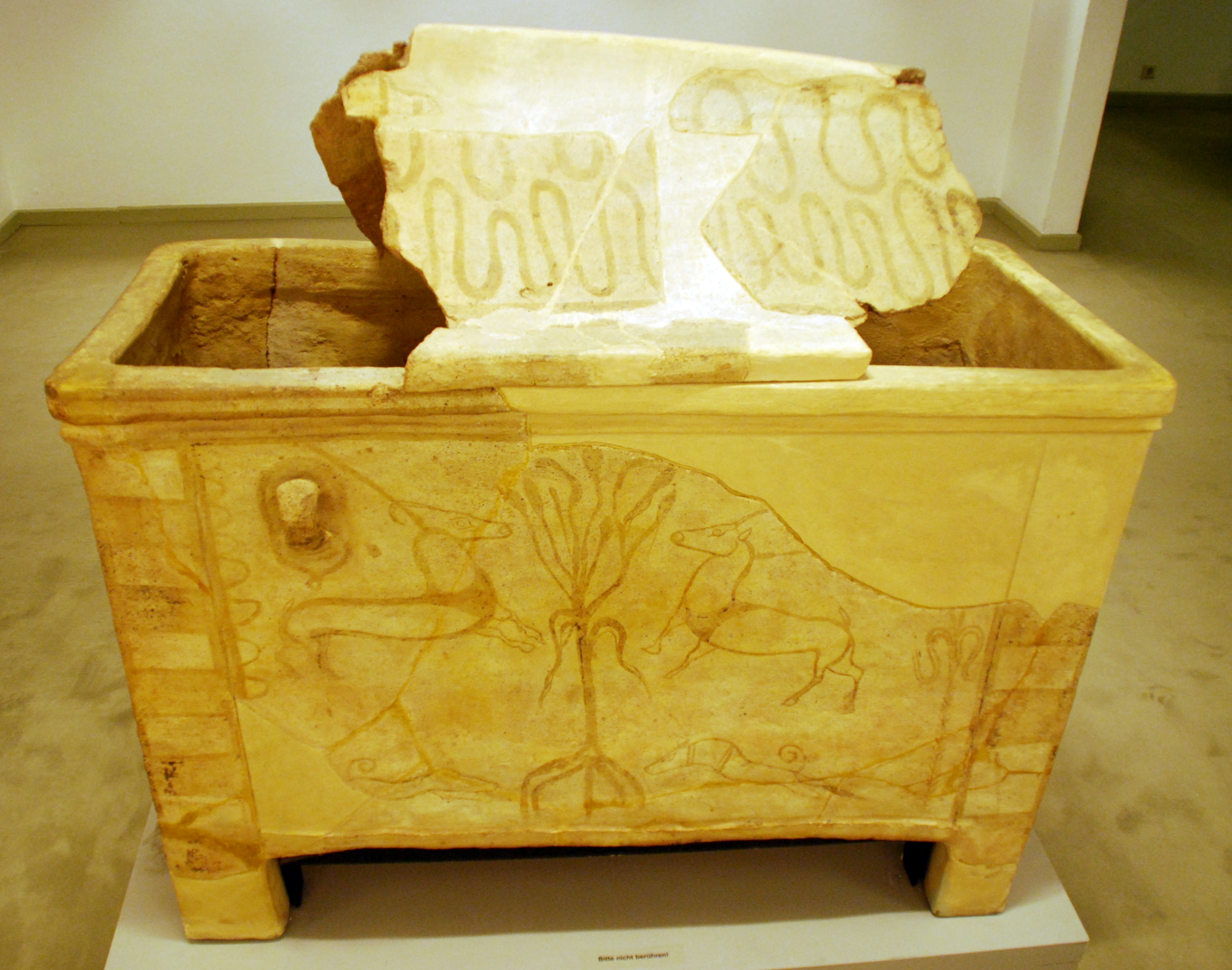
- Created: c. 1350 BC
- Present location: Museum August Kestner, Lower Saxony, Germany
- Identification: 1989.30

A Minoan Sarcophagus, also called a larnax, is among the major display pieces of the antiquities collection of the Museum August Kestner in Hanover, Germany.

The larnax is dated to the 14th century BC, which corresponds to the Late Minoan III A period, and probably comes from the island of Crete. It entered the antiquities collection of the Museum August Kestner in 1989 (inventory number 1989.30)

Larnakes are pottery sarcophagi modelled on similar coffins in wood and were a standard part of Late Minoan funerary practices. Too small for bodies, they were used as "ash-chests" after cremation. The Hanover larnax survives largely complete except for the fragmentary lid. Missing portions, especially on one of the short sides, have been reconstructed in modern times. The remains of the lid have been connected together and partially restored. The lid is decorated with two bands of waves, one on top of the other. The lid has the form of a pitched roof, flattened where it meets the edge of the sarcophagus, so that it sits firmly on the sarcophagus.

The sarcophagus itself is painted on all four sides in a single brownish colour, which is typical. As usual, the composition of the painted scheme is elaborate, but the technique is rather crude by the standards of earlier Minoan painting in palaces. On the main side, a tree is shown in the centre, with dogs on either side chasing after goats, which have been pierced by spears. One of the short sides shows two wild goats fighting each other, the other short side and the reverse have floral motifs. The interior of the sarcophagus is not nearly as carefully worked as the outside. At the edges of the longs sides, handle holes have been created, but on both sides they only survive at one end. The sarcophagus' legs are protruding pillars at all four corners, which run from the rim to the ground. Apart from a column on the back side, which was decorated with floral patterns, all columns are decorated with thick painted stripes alternating with bare clay.

== Gallery ==
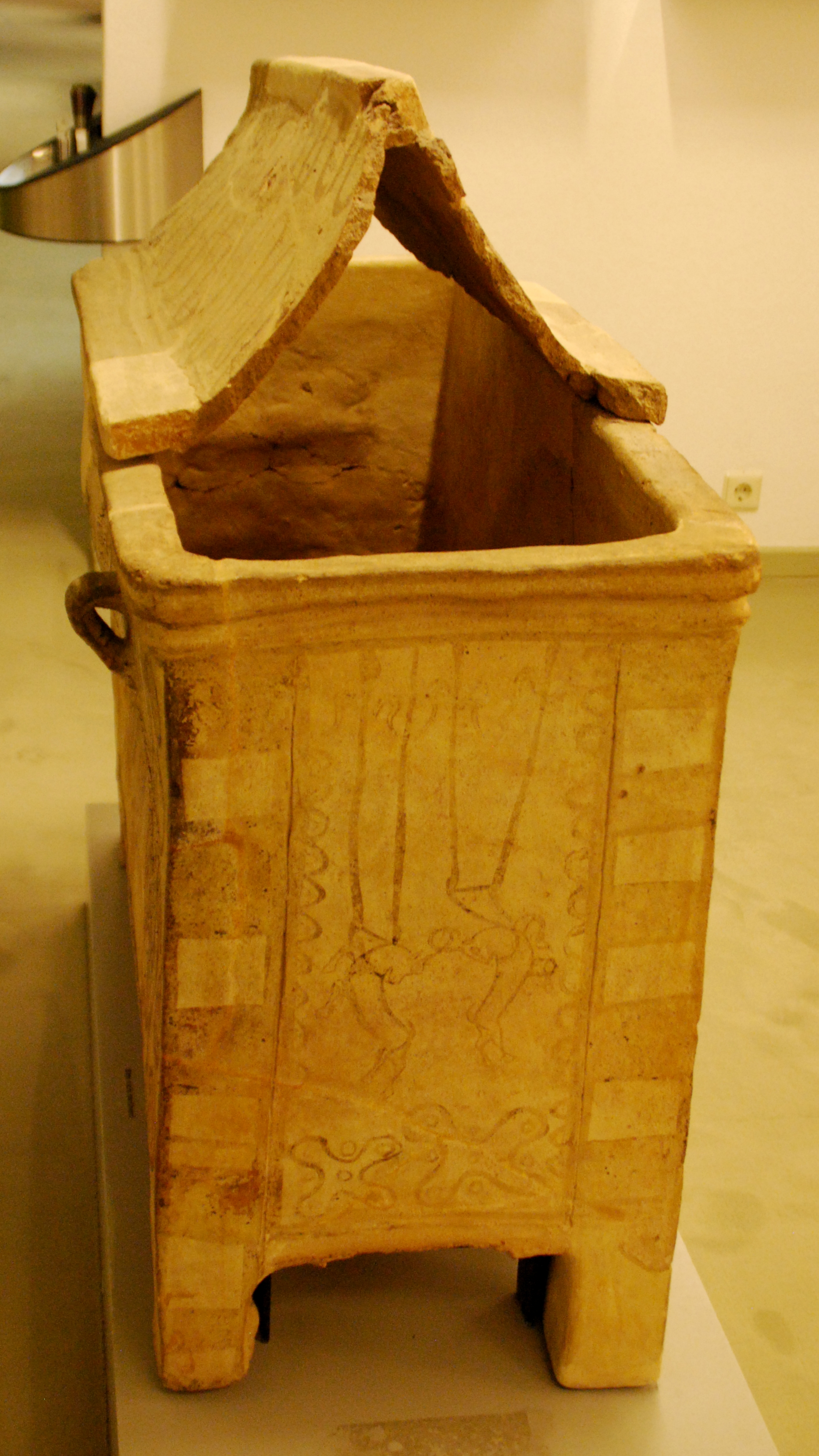
Side view: wild goats fighting

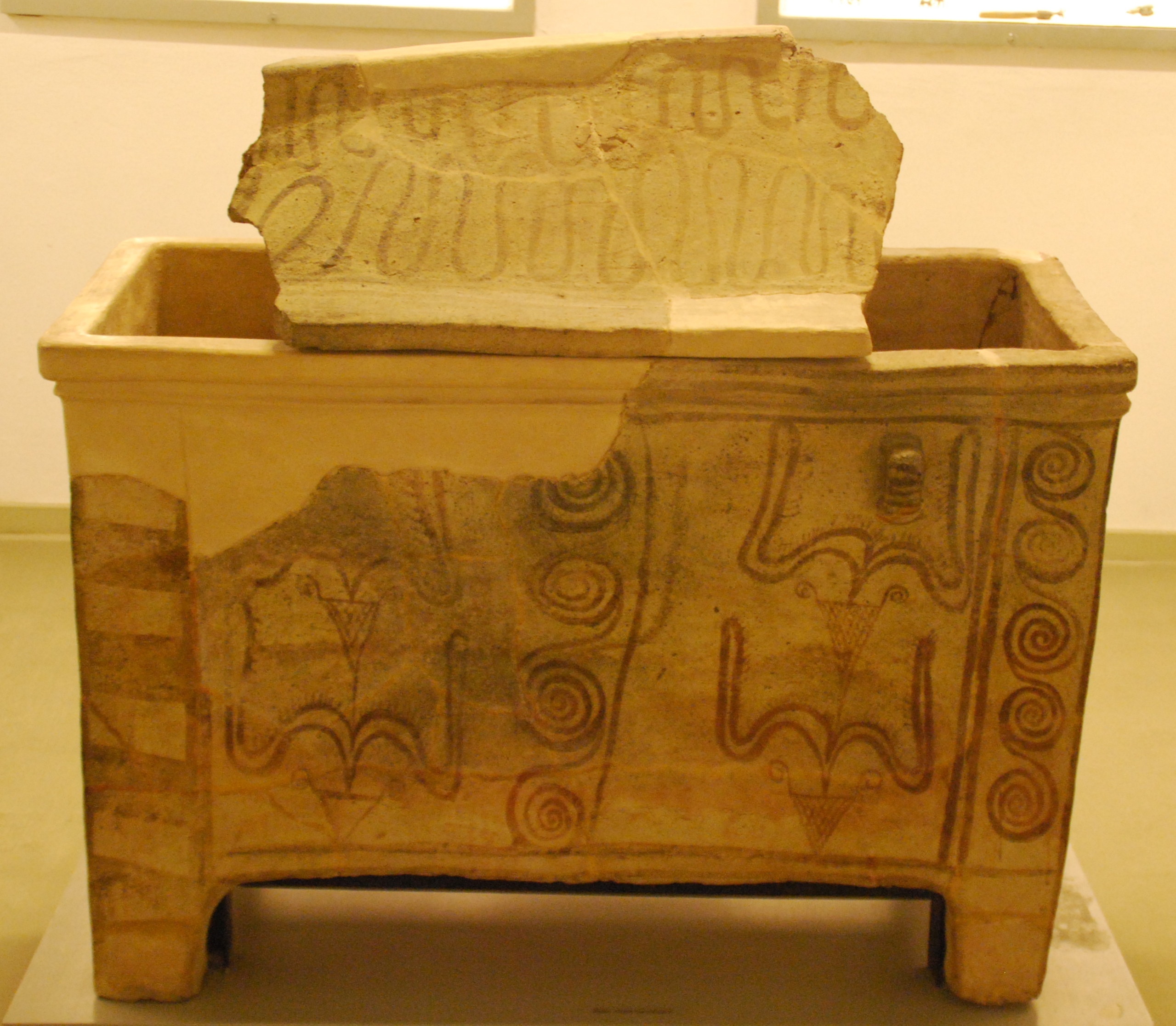
Rear view: floral motif

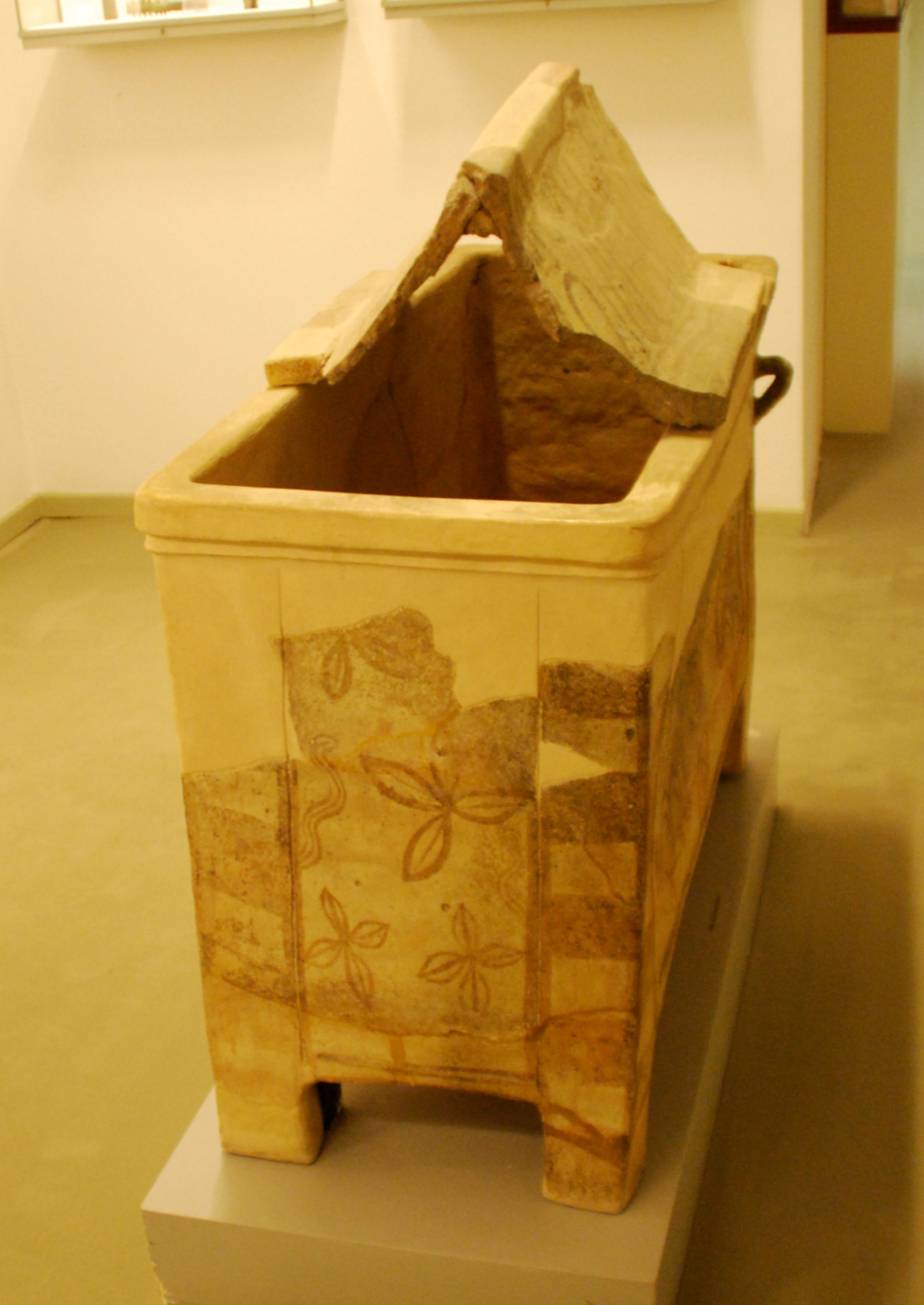
Side view: floral motif
