= Qenna =

Qenna was the name of a merchant in Ancient Egypt. Qenna's tomb contained the Papyrus of Qenna, a copy of the Book of the Dead.

The papyrus is in the collection of the Royal Museum of Antiquities in Leiden, and is about 50 ft long. The papyrus includes spell 151, which refers to embalming.
