= Gemenefhorbak =

Egyptian vizier of the 26th Dynasty

- Vizier of the North
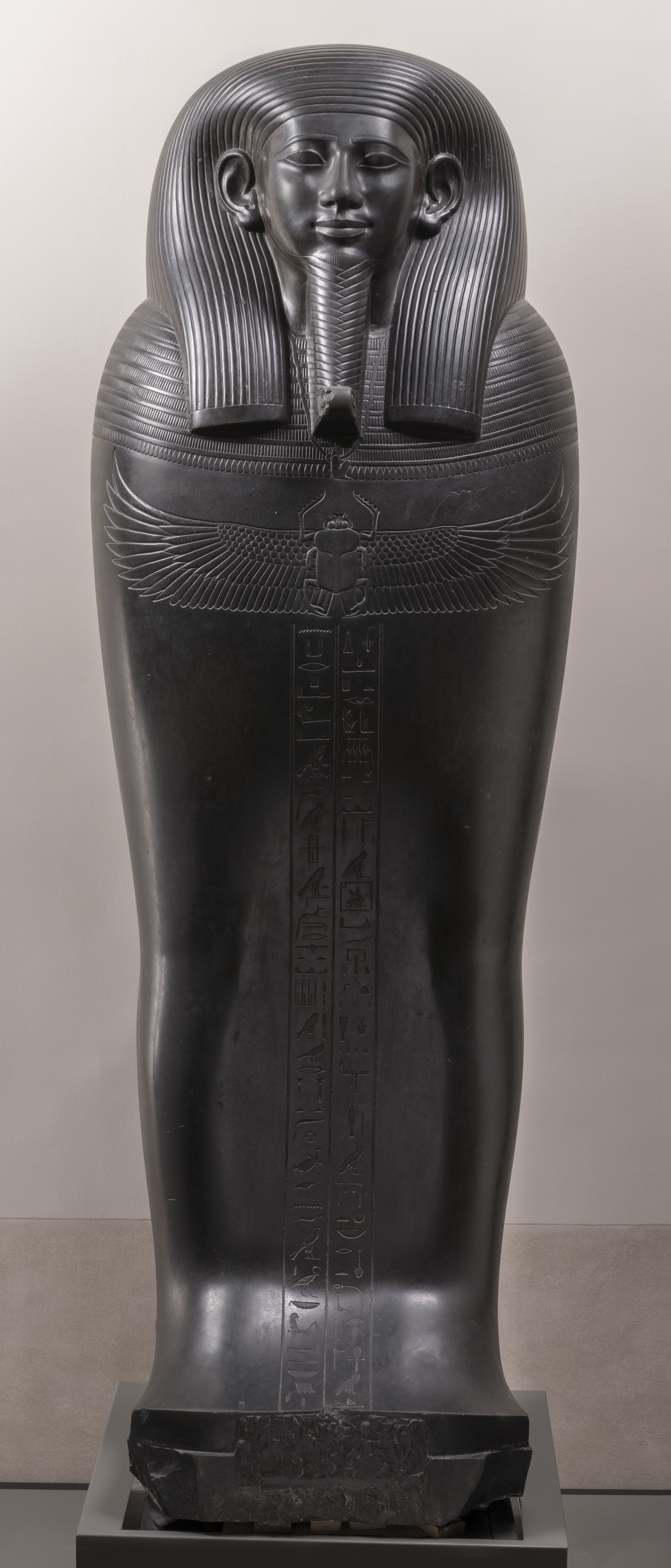
- Sarcophagus lid of Gemenefhorbak. Turin, Museo Egizio.
- Dynasty: 26th Dynasty

Gemenefhorbak (Ancient Egyptian: 𓅠𓈖𓐰𓆑𓅃𓅡𓐴𓏤𓎡𓀼, romanized: gm.n=f-ḥr-bꜣk) was an ancient Egyptian vizier who officiated during the 26th Dynasty, most likely under Psamtik I (r. 664–610 BCE). His father was the vizier Iufaa.

== Biography ==
Gemenefhorbak was the "Vizier of the North", meaning that he exercised his authority over Lower Egypt. He is mainly known from his meta-graywacke sarcophagus which is now in the Museo Egizio (Turin 2201); on it, the carving of a necklace with the goddess Maat is a sign of his judicial office. The sarcophagus is also carved with a chapter of the Book of the Dead, as well as Gemenefhorbak's numerous titles; here he is also provided with the rather unusual title of "Controller of the great courts" (Ḫrp ḥwwt wrwt).
