= TombQuest =

Children's book series

Tombquest
- Author: Michael Northrop
- Language: English
- Genre: Children's novel
- Publisher: Scholastic (US)
- Published: 2015-2016

Tombquest is a series of books that is published by Scholastic Inc and was written by Michael Northrop. It follows two main characters, Alex Sennefer and his best friend Ren Duran, as they battle Ancient Egyptian forces. When Alex is on the verge of death, his mother uses the Book of the Dead to resurrect him. However, this raises five Death Walkers, who are extremely hard to defeat. Alex and Ren must race around the world to defeat the Death Walkers and defeat other evil forces that have arisen as well.

Summarys:

Book 1: Alex's illness is undiagnosed; a mystery ailment with no cure. Modern medicine is powerless. His fate is sealed. Doctor Maggie Bauer is ready to roll the dice and use the tools available to her as a curator at The Metropolitan Museum of Art.

To date, there are five books in the series: Book of the Dead (2015), Amulet Keepers (2015), Valley of Kings (2015), The Stone Warriors (2015), and The Final Kingdom (2016).
