= The Stone Warriors =

2015 book by Michael Northrop

- First edition
- Author: Michael Northrop
- Language: English
- Series: TombQuest
- Genre: Children's novel
- Published: December 29, 2015 Scholastic (US)
- Publication place: United States
- Media type: Print (Paperback)
- Pages: 208
- ISBN: 978-0545782869; 0545782864
- Preceded by: Valley of Kings
- Followed by: The Final Kingdom

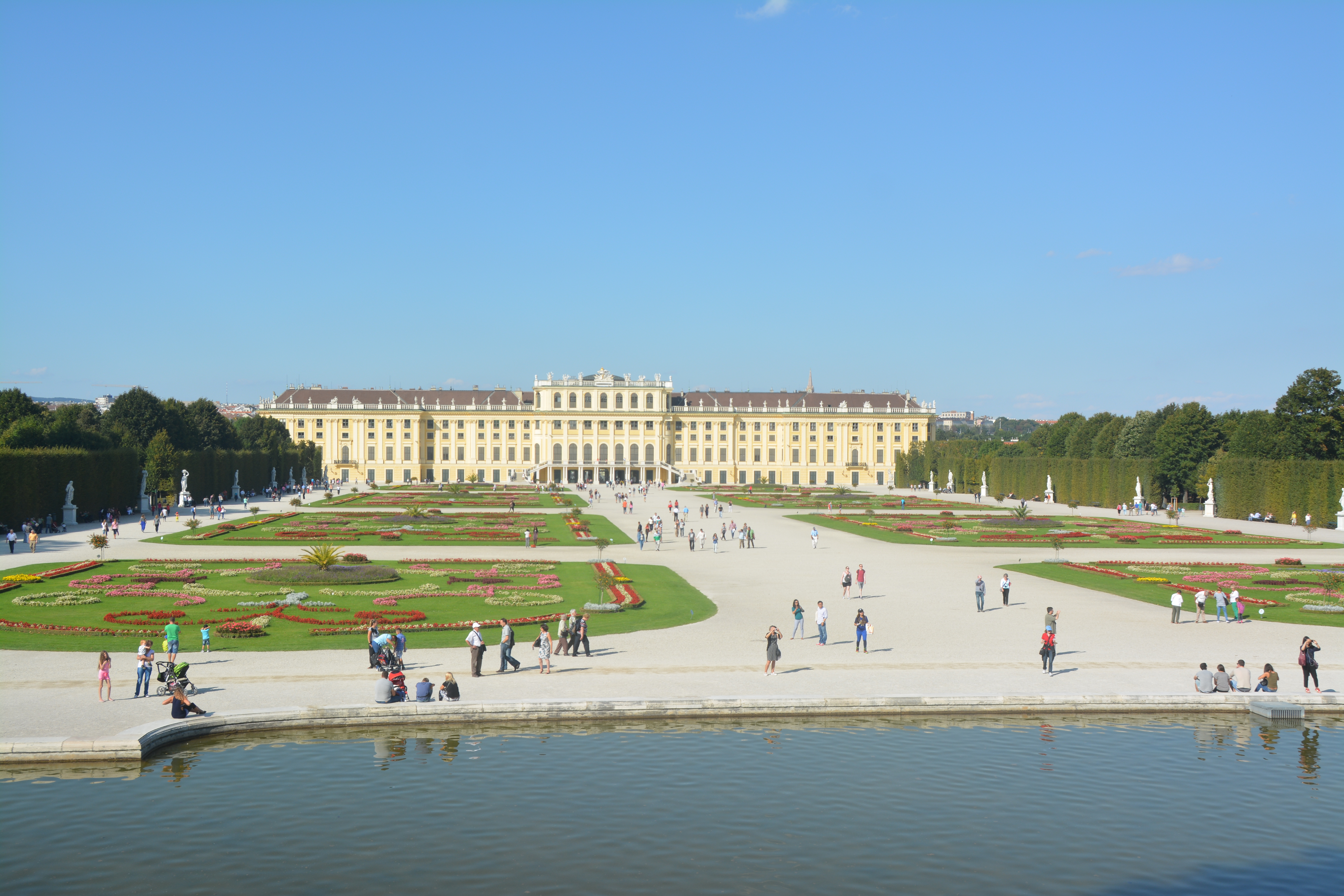
The Palace of Schonbrunn in Vienna, the city in which Alex and Ren end up in the beginning of The Stone Warriors.

The Stone Warriors is the fourth and second-to-last book in the TombQuest series. It was written by Michael Northrop. It was originally published on December 29, 2015.

== Plot of Book ==
=== Chapters 1-12 (Pages 1-90) ===
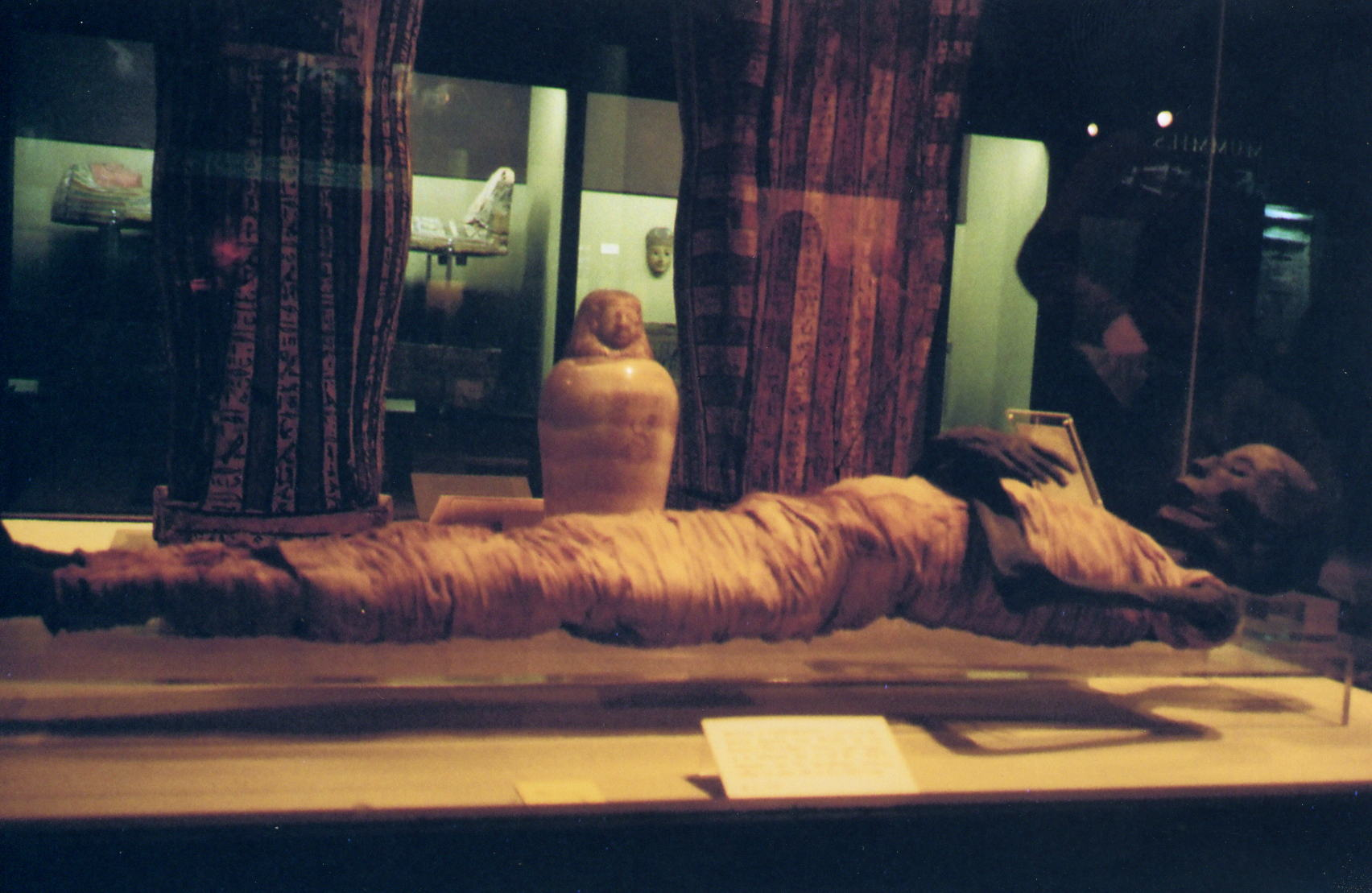
A mummy displayed in a museum case.

The book begins in an unknown city, in which Alex Sennefer and his best friend Ren Duran are running from a couple of guards. They manage to escape into a small side street. Alex reflects on how Ren and he were looking for his mom and the Lost Spells, powerful spells in the Ancient Egyptian Book of the Dead. When he was on life support, his mother had used those spells to revive him, but had caused Death Walkers to escape. And, to make matters worse, an evil cult named The Order is working with the Death Walkers for evil purposes. The pair appreciates the beauty of the city they are in, and find out that they are in Vienna, Austria.

In a secluded park, they discuss their journey. When Ren sleeps, Alex is attacked by a sheut, a shadowy Vessel that had a person’s ka and ba, or their spirit and self. Ren uses her amulet, an ibis that represents the god Thoth, in order to ward away the ancient spirit. They get a voice message from Dr. Ernst Todtman, a German scholar, and goes to a restaurant to meet him. However, it is a trap, and a fly-masked operative of The Order attacks them. After Alex wards him off using his scarab amulet, he saves Ren from a decoy waiter and they escape. They take an airplane to Cairo, Egypt, and meet up with Todtman. They discuss their next move, and based on a small clue, they decide to go to Alexandria. They meet a woman named Safa, and talk about Maggie - Alex’s mom. The next morning, they witness a loose mummy being burned by firefighters. They also meet up with Dr. Alshuff, who knew Maggie, but who they discover is a liar. Next, they look through Maggie’s paper and dissertation for more clues, finding out that she might be in a village named Minyahur. However, the fly operative - named Aff Neb - attacks them again. Some Order gunmen also captures the group. The trio wakes up to find themselves in a pit. They also figure out that they are sacrifice.

=== Chapters 13- 24 (Pages 91-186) ===
The group also finds Pai, a mummy cat that Ren had freed from a museum case in London. Todtman theorizes that the Spells have broken the boundary between the worlds of the living and of the dead. This would redeem The Order and the Death Walkers invincible. The leader of The Order suddenly appears the pit, wearing a vulture mask. He offers them life in exchange for information, but the group refuses. The leader the leaves, and in his place, a Death Walker emerges. It is a mummy with a mixture of flesh and stone. It is the most ancient one the group has ever seen, made with crude mummification processes. The Walker has the power to liquefy the ground, thus sinking Ren and Alex. Todtman is hit in the head by a chunk of rock and also encased in rock. When the Walker comes to feed on the souls of them, the mummy cat Pai tries to save them, in vain. After Pai is crushed, the cat goddess Bastet appears. After the Walker challenges the goddess, her sister goddess, or Sekhmet appears. She is the Destroyer, or the goddess of violence. The new goddess burns up the Walker and pulverizes the body against the wall of the pit. This creates a hole in the wall, in which the group escapes. They subdue several armed guards, and then they run into the five Order operatives they had already seen- Al-Dab’u the jackal, Ta-mesah the crocodile, Peshwar the lioness, the vulture leader, and Aff Neb the fly. However, they discover that it is actually stone statues that the five are trying to inhabit in the afterlife. When they try to leave, Order forces attack them. Ren and Alex sees Luke, Alex’s cousin that betrayed them. Due to advancing enemy forces, they have no choice but to leave him imprisoned. Todtman hijacked a Mercedes-Benz and drives to Minyahur. The Order plans to inhabit the stone statues, and working with the Walkers, control nations. After they reach the village, they encounter an evil spirit that Ren wards away. The next morning, after a breakfast of tea and biscuits, they continue their search for Maggie. After they find her, she tells them about how she has been guarding the Lost Spells and trying to solve the damage done without killing Alex. However, Aff Neb finds them, along with armed gunmen. Peshwar also arrives to help. Millions of flies under Aff Neb’s command assault them, and Peshwar uses her energy daggers on them. However, Todtman and Maggie uses their amulets to defeat their two foes. But the vulture leader ambushes them and defeats the group, stealing the Lost Spells Maggie had been hiding. But the vulture leader reveals that he is Alex’s father. The book ends with the Order having their amulets, the Keepers, the Lost Spells, and the Death Walkers.
