= Book of the Dead (Art Institute of Chicago) =

The Art Institute of Chicago contains a Book of the Dead scroll, an Ancient Egyptian papyrus depicting funerary spells. This scroll of funerary spells serves as a protection from "Second Death". In ancient Egyptian spiritual practice, the term "Second Death" refers to the phenomenon of the body permanently separating from the soul. The Book of the Dead scroll is made of papyrus, a material made of reed plants cultivated on marshy plantations, which is then cut into strips and left to dry in horizontal and vertical rows. The scroll also contains pigments used to inscribe the funerary spells.

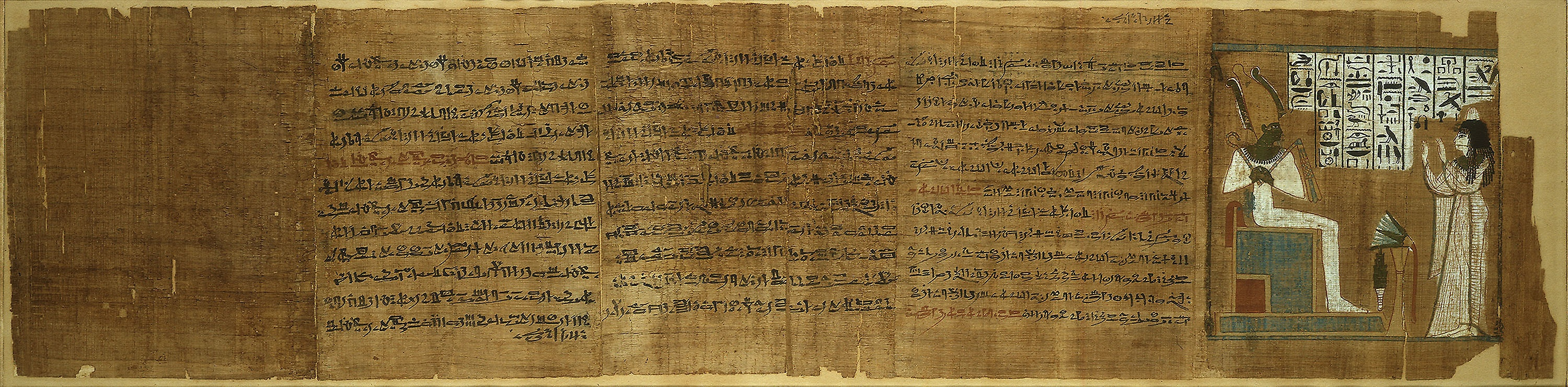
Scene from the Book of the Dead, Third Intermediate Period, Dynasty 21 (1070–946 BC). The Art Institute of Chicago.

== Description ==
The scroll belonging to the Art Institute of Chicago was found in the tomb of a woman named Taywhenwtmut. The scroll is illustrated very beautifully, suggesting this woman may have been of higher status. The scroll was commissioned to illustrate the God Osiris. This scroll's function has changed since its creation creating the biography. It first served as a guide into the afterlife for Taywhenwtmut, it then functioned as a commodity when sold by the archaeologist. Presently it functions as a contribution to broaden the education of the general public's knowledge on Ancient Egyptian culture and specifically funerary practices at The Art Institute of Chicago.

== Donation ==
The artifact was donated to The Art Institute of Chicago by Henry H. Getty, Charles Hutchinson, Robert H. Flemming, and Norman W. Harris in 1894. These donors have also contributed many other Ancient Egyptian works to the Art Institute of Chicago. Some of which are as follows: Statuette of Imhotep, Egyptian Ptolemaic Period (332-30 B.C.) Bronze h. 11.7 cm (4 5/8 in.), Amulet of the God Horus as a Falcon, Late Period - Ptolemaic Period, (664-30 B.C.) Faience, 6.9 x 2.8 x 6.8 cm (2 3/4 x 1 1/8 x 2 5/8 in.) Ointment Vessel with Lid, New Kingdom, Dynasty 18 (c. 1570–1293 B.C.) Egyptian alabaster and steatite, Vessel: 12.3 x 11.4 x 11.4 cm (4 7/8 x 4 1/2 x 4 1/2 in.); lid: 0.7 x 6.7 x 6.7 cm (5/16 x 2 5/8 x 2 5/8 in.) Around the time of this scroll's donation in 1894, large contributions were made by a few of the men seen as creators of the "advent" of Egyptian artifacts in the Midwest through Anthropological and Archaeological work. John D. Rockefeller, his son John D. Rockefeller Jr., William Rainey Harper, and James Henry Breasted made large contributions to the Egyptian Collections of The Oriental Institute of Chicago in 1890.

== Display ==
The Art Institute of Chicago was founded in 1879. The Art Institute of Chicago collects and preserves items of universal cultural and artistic value in support of public interest and education of the fine arts. The curation of the scroll presented at The Art Institute of Chicago explains that the scroll originated from the 21st Egyptian Dynasty, 1070-946 BC also known as the Third Intermediate Period. The scroll was part of the exhibit; When the Greeks Ruled Egypt. This exhibit was on view through July 27, 2014. The objects of this exhibit are either part of The Art Institute's permanent collection, loans from the University of Chicago, loans from the Oriental Institute, or private loans. This scroll is part of the permanent collection.

== See also ==
- Osiris
- Book of the Dead
- Art Institute of Chicago
- Oriental Institute of Chicago
- Third Intermediate Period of Egypt
