= Iufaa (vizier) =

Egyptian vizier of the 26th Dynasty

- Vizier of the North
Egyptian name
i w f aA A40jw.f-ꜥꜣ
- Dynasty: 26th dynasty
- Pharaoh: Psamtik I
- Children: Gemenefhorbak

Iufaa (Ancient Egyptian: 𓇋𓅱𓆑𓐰𓉻𓚲, romanized: jw.f-ꜥꜣ) was an ancient Egyptian vizier of the 26th Dynasty, who was in office under king Psamtik I (ruled 664–610 BC).

Iufaa is only known from a statue, that appeared 1958 on the art market and was then sold to a collection in Mexico. The collection was dissolved in 1992. Since then, the location of the statue is unknown. The only surviving documents are photos. Iufaa is shown kneeling on the ground, only the lower part of the statue is preserved. Head and chest are missing. On the base, back and kilt are inscriptions reporting Iufaa's name and providing several titles including those of a vizier.

Iufaa was most likely the father of the vizier Gemenefhorbak, who is only known from his sarcophagus. On this monument are also mentioned the parents of Gemenefhorbak. His father was a certain Iufaa, who does not bear the vizier's title. Other titles, such as priest of Bastet or leader of the houses appear on both documents, making the identification of both Iufaa's very likely.
