= Book of the Dead of Qenna =

Papyrus document housed at the Dutch National Museum of Antiquities

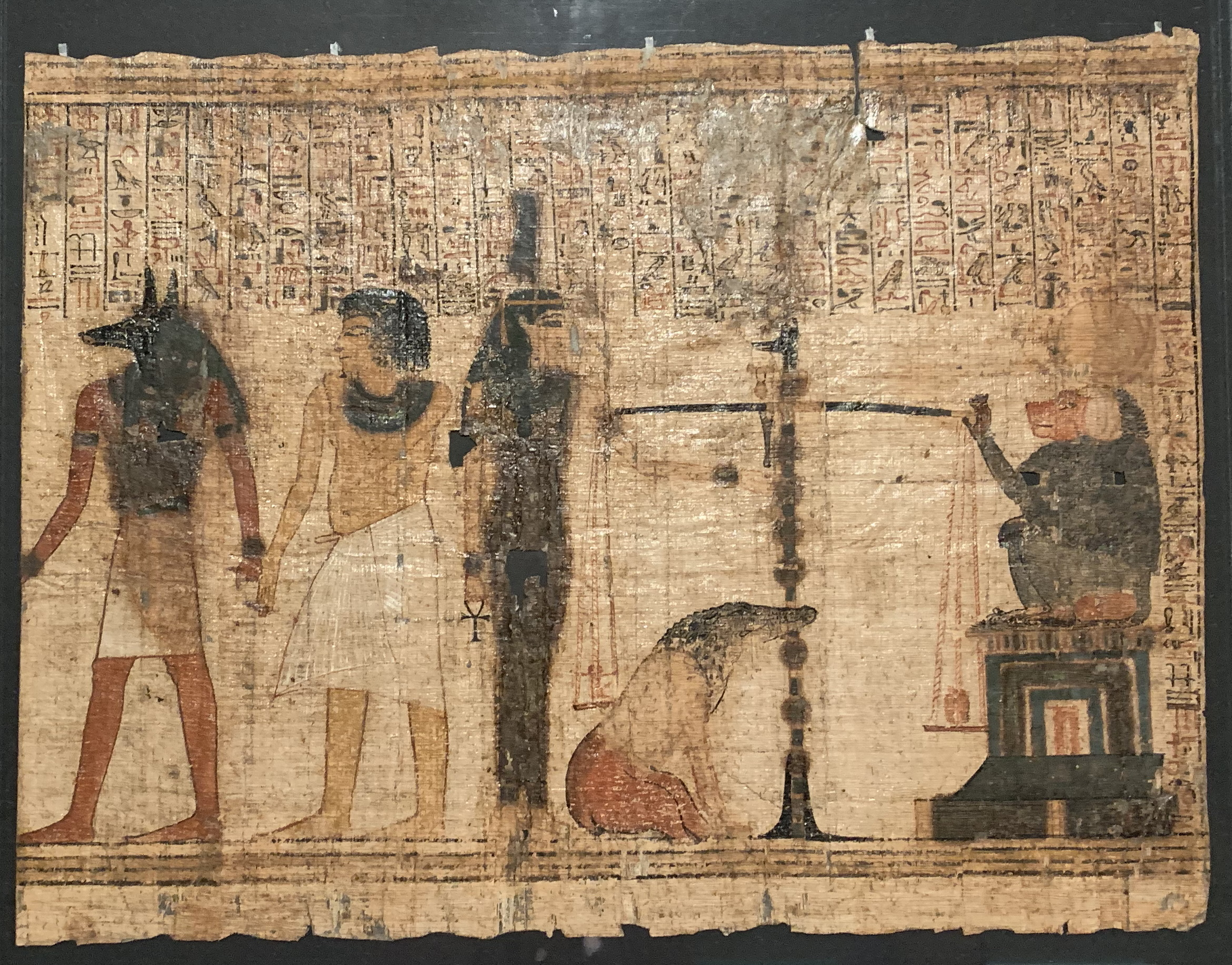
Papyrus of Qenna, Sheet 8. Rijksmuseum van Oudheden, Leiden, The Netherlands.

The Egyptian Book of the Dead of Qenna (Leemans T2, Rijksmuseum van Oudheden, Leiden, Netherlands) is a papyrus document housed at the Dutch National Museum of Antiquities in Leiden. One of several thousand papyri containing material drawn from Book of the Dead funerary texts, Qenna uniquely includes a passage that describes a deceased person's activity in an afterlife location it calls the “house of hearts.” While the house of hearts is mentioned in at least two tomb inscriptions, Qenna treats it in more detail. The passage appears as an addendum within Spell 151 of the Book of the Dead:

"You will enter the house of hearts, the place which is full of hearts. You will take the one that is yours and put it in its place, without your hand being hindered. Your foot will not be stopped from walking. You will not walk upside down. You will walk upright."

In the typical presentation, Spell 151 centers on care of the mummy and its accessories by Anubis and other gods, especially the four sons of Horus. The format is to have each god or entity involved say something which is quoted by columns of hieroglyphic text next to a small illustration of that entity. Anubis himself does not speak, but is shown standing over the mummy, which lies on a bier. Canopic jars containing the decedent's viscera are underneath the bier. The goddess Isis, four gods known as the sons of Horus, and the ba (a "personality," or, literally, "what is immanent" of the deceased are among those with speaking parts in this spell. The importance of the decedent's heart is shown by the custom of leaving it in situ during the embalming process. Evidence of the need to protect internal organs from harm even after removal is abundant in the use of canopic jars to preserve them. The heart, not placed in a jar, benefited from its own magical utterances, for example where Book of the Dead Spell 27 says,

"Hail to you, lords of eternal repetition, founders of eternal sameness! Don’t take my heart from me."

A role for Isis in the proceedings is attested in the Coffin Texts at Spell 148:

“Oh!” says Atum (to Isis). “Guard your heart, O woman!”

This quote, which relates to her pregnancy with Horus, holds uncertain relevance to the House of Hearts issue. Isis speaks in Spell 151, however. She is the guardian of Imseti, who in turn guards the canopic jar containing the liver. As well Isis is a member of the Heliopolitan cosmology's Ennead, a system of gods often extended to include Horus. Book of the Dead Spell 30A appears to connect the heart with afterlife judgments, imploring:

"My heart of my mother, my heart of my mother, my heart of my earthly being! Do not stand against me as witness."

The panel of gods evaluating the deceased appear in Spell 125. By the time of Qenna, the 18th Dynasty Theban redaction of the creation and mortuary had taken place, resulting in the Book of the Dead itself, selections of which were copied onto papyrus and included in burial equipment. Yet this material derives from the earlier Coffin Texts already having demonstrated an intimate trio of heart, mother, and ba:

"Geb has opened your eyes for you, which were blind; he has stretched out your thighs, which were bent. The heart of your mother has been given to you, your heart of your body. Your ba is in the earth; your corpse is in the ground." CT I, 55f-56d.

Geb is another member of the Ennead. Thebes of course emphasized its powerful state god Amun, soon also in syncretic manifestation as Amun-Re. It is notable that these gods remain segregated from the heart-related material above, having their own hymns within the Book of the Dead corpus. Indeed, the deceased's heart remains singular and crucial in mortuary to the end of Egyptian religion. Qenna, although it omits Spell 30A, sheds additional light on this process of belief.

Reasons that the heart might need returning to the deceased, despite its having been left in the body during mummification, remain obscure. Considered a signal in this question is the “weighing of the heart” scene in Book of the Dead Spell 125 (also conducted by Anubis), which shows the heart outside the body, among other instances in funerary literature of acts or incantations to restore the heart and its function.

Qenna appears to date from the late 18th or early 19th Dynasty, based on the decedent's soft, rounded abdomen and the clothing style, with simple pleated kilt in his pictorial representations in the papyrus.

== See also ==
- Book of the Dead
- Book of the Dead of Amen-em-hat

== Bibliography ==
- Allen, J.P. 2010. Middle Egyptian: An Introduction to the Language and Culture of Hieroglyphs, 2nd Ed. Cambridge Univ. Press.
- Bunson, Margaret. 2009. Encyclopedia of Ancient Egypt. Infobase Pub.
- Von Dassow, E. (Ed.) 1998. The Egyptian Book of the Dead: The Book of Going Forth by Day: The Complete Papyrus of Ani. Chronicle Books.
- van Dijk, J. 1995. “Entering the House of Hearts: An Addition to Chapter 151 in the Book of the Dead of Qenna.” In Oudheidkundige Mededeelingen Rijksmuseum Oudheden 75, pp. 7–12. A digital copy is available from the author's academic homepage at http://www.jacobusvandijk.nl/docs/OMRO_75.pdf
- Faulkner, R. 1968. “The Pregnancy of Isis.” Journal of Egyptian Archaeology 54, pp. 40–44.
- Kemp, B. 2007. How to Read the Egyptian Book of the Dead. W.W. Norton.
- Shaw, Ian, (Ed.). 2000. The Oxford History of Ancient Egypt. Oxford.
- Smith, M. 2009. "Democratization of the Afterlife." UCLA Encyclopedia of Egyptology, Univ. California Los Angeles. eScholarship.org
- Taylor, J. 2001. Death and the Afterlife in Ancient Egypt. Univ. of Chicago Press.
- Zabkar, L. 1968. A Study of the Ba Concept in Ancient Egyptian Texts. U. Chicago Press.
