= Book of the Dead of Amen-em-hat =

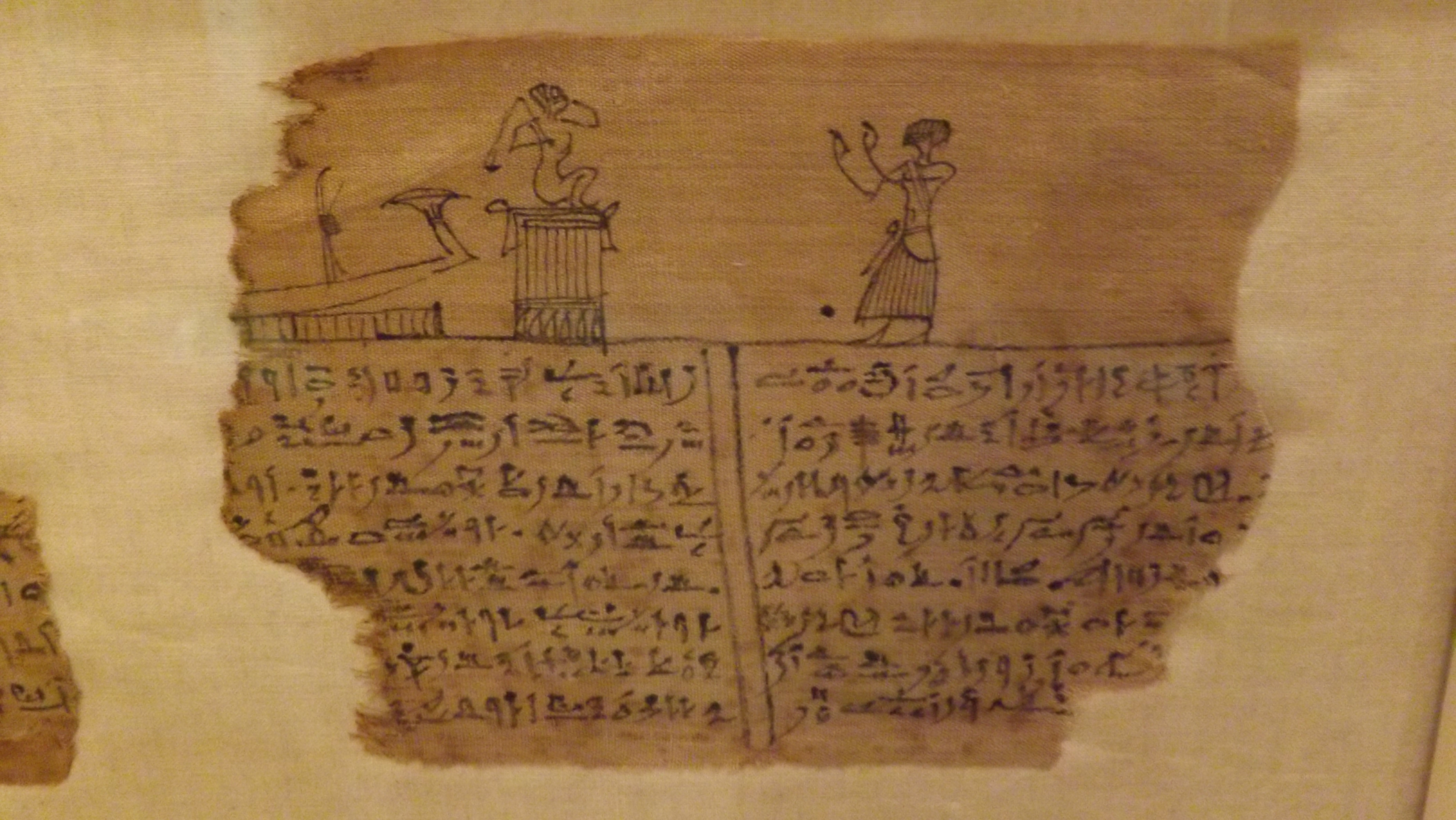
Small fragment and illustration from the Book of the Dead on display at the Royal Ontario Museum, Toronto, Ontario

Book of the Dead of Amen-em-hat is a seven-metre-long scroll on display at the Royal Ontario Museum. A Book of the Dead is a key funerary (and religious) artifact in any tomb from Ancient Egypt. Archaeologists have discovered a wide range of styles and details on scrolls which have led scholars to conclude that the Book of the Dead was an object any Ancient Egyptian ensured they had for their journey to the afterlife. The Ancient Egyptians believed that the recently deceased had to navigate a dangerous underworld to reach the afterlife. The Book of the Dead contained spells and prayers that provided guidance and protection through the journey.

== The ROM's Book of the Dead ==
The Book of the Dead in the Royal Ontario Museum is an iconic object in their collection. Purchased in Egypt by Charles T. Currelly, this Book is a seven-metre-long scroll that was found in the tomb of Amen-em-hat near Luxor. Restored in 2009, Ahen-em-hat's Book of the Dead offers a number of unique images and writing. Fragments of the scroll are on permanent display in the Egyptian Gallery. The larger sections of papyrus, most notably a large and detailed illustration of the Hall of Judgment scene, were on display during the spring of 2009.

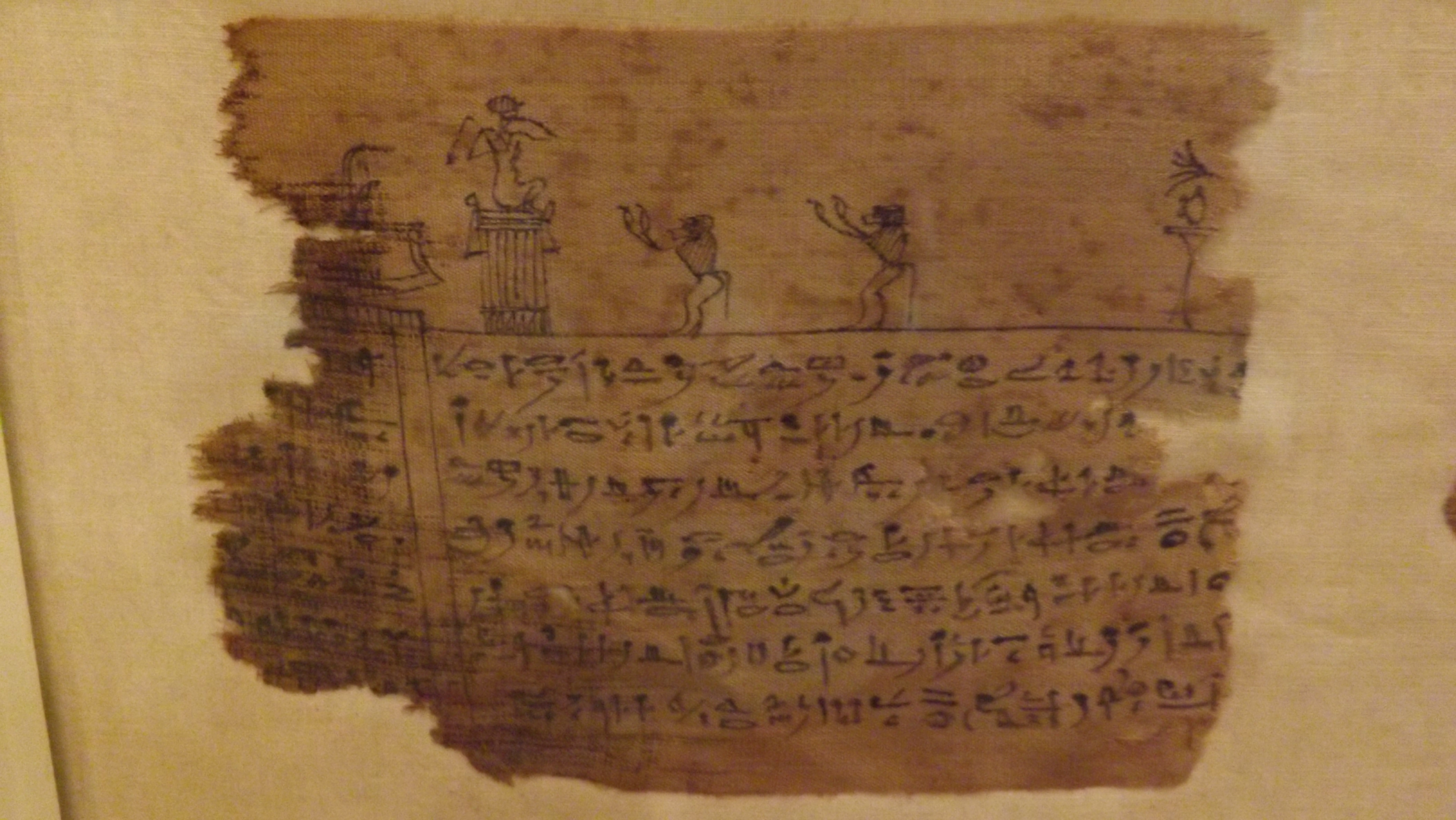
Small fragment from the Book of the Dead on display at the Royal Ontario Museum, Toronto, Ontario

== Amen-em-hat ==
Amen-em-hat was a wealthy Egyptian living near Luxor during the Ptolemaic Period (around 320-300 BCE). Very little is known about him, his profession and his family. Scenes on the fragments suggest he had a knowledge of farming and fishing.

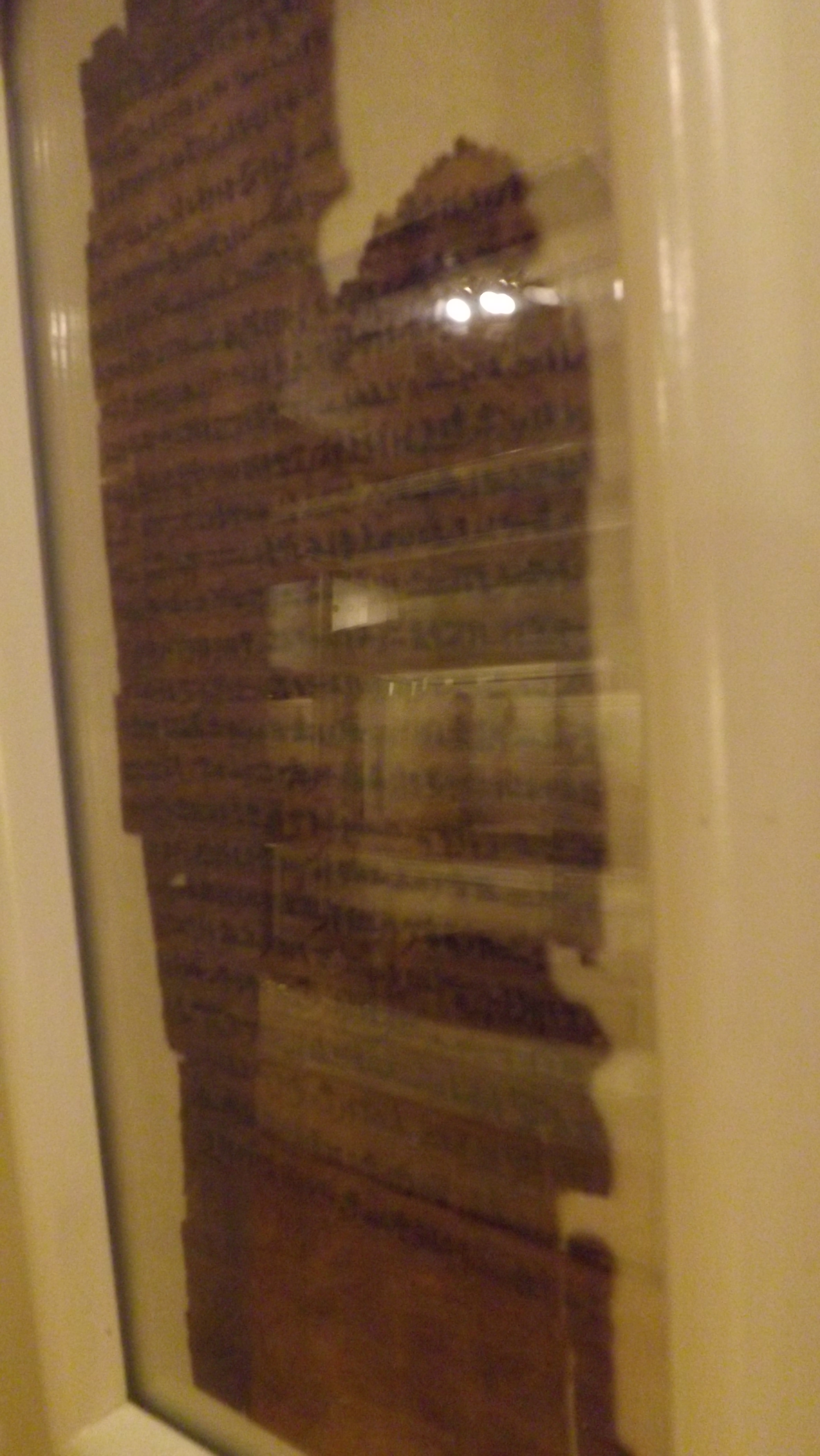
A tall fragment of the Book of the Dead on display at the Royal Ontario Museum, Toronto, Ontario
