= Christian Loeben =

German Egyptologist (born 1961)

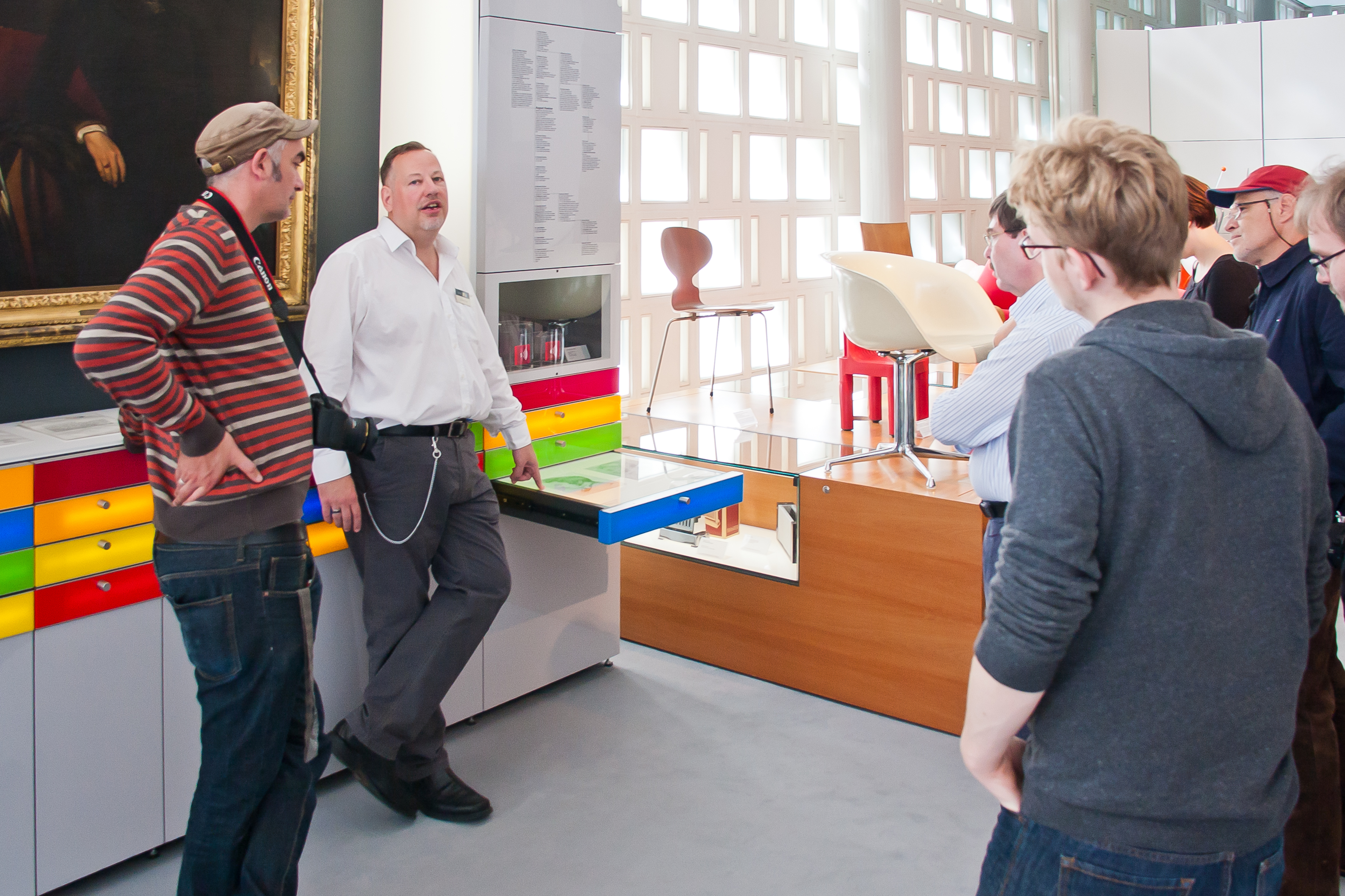
Christian E. Loeben (second from the left) leading a tour at the Museum August Kestner, September 2013.

Christian E. Loeben (* 22 December 1961) is a German Egyptologist.

Loeben studied Egyptology and art history at the Free University of Berlin from 1980 to 1985. Subsequently he was employed as an academic tour guide. From 1992 until 2003 he was a lecturer of Egyptology at Humboldt University of Berlin, filling in for the vacant professorship of Egyptology for his last two semesters. Here also in 1999 he received his doctorate with a dissertation entitled Beobachtungen zu Kontext und Funktion königlicher Statuen im Amun-Tempel von Karnak (Studies in the Context and Function of Royal Statues in the Temple of Amun at Karnak). Since 2004 he has been curator of the Egyptological collection of the Museum August Kestner and visiting lecturer at the University of Göttingen. Loeben is especially involved in popular engagement with Egyptology, appearing frequently in the media as an expert on Egyptological questions and offering many public lectures.

== Publications ==
- Beobachtungen zu Kontext und Funktion königlicher Statuen im Amun-Tempel von Karnak. (Studies in the Context and Function of Royal Statues in the Temple of Amun at Karnak) Wodtke und Stegbauer, Leipzig 2001, ISBN 3-934374-05-0
- with André B. Wiese. Köstlichkeiten aus Kairo! Die ägyptische Sammlung des Konditorei- und Kaffeehaus-Besitzers Achille Groppi (1890 - 1949). (Delights of Cairo! The Egyptian Collection of Pastry chef and Barrista Achille Groppi (1890 - 1949)). Antikenmuseum Basel und Sammlung Ludwig und Museum August Kestner, Basel/ Hannover 2008, ISBN 978-3-924029-45-6, ISBN 3-924029-45-8 und ISBN 978-3-905057-24-9
- with Sven Kappel. Die Pflanzen im altägyptischen Garten. Ein Bestandskatalog der ägyptischen Sammlung im Museum August Kestner. (The Plants of Ancient Egyptian Gardens. A Catalogue of the Egyptian Collection of the Museum August Kestner). Leidorf, Rahden 2009, ISBN 978-3-86757-452-5
- Die Ägypten-Sammlung des Museum August Kestner und ihre (Kriegs-)Verluste. (The Egypt-Collection of Museum August and its (War) Casualties). Series: Museum Kestnerianum Vol. 15. Leidorf, Rahden 2011, ISBN 978-3-86757-454-9
