= Museum August Kestner =

Museum in Hanover, Lower Saxony

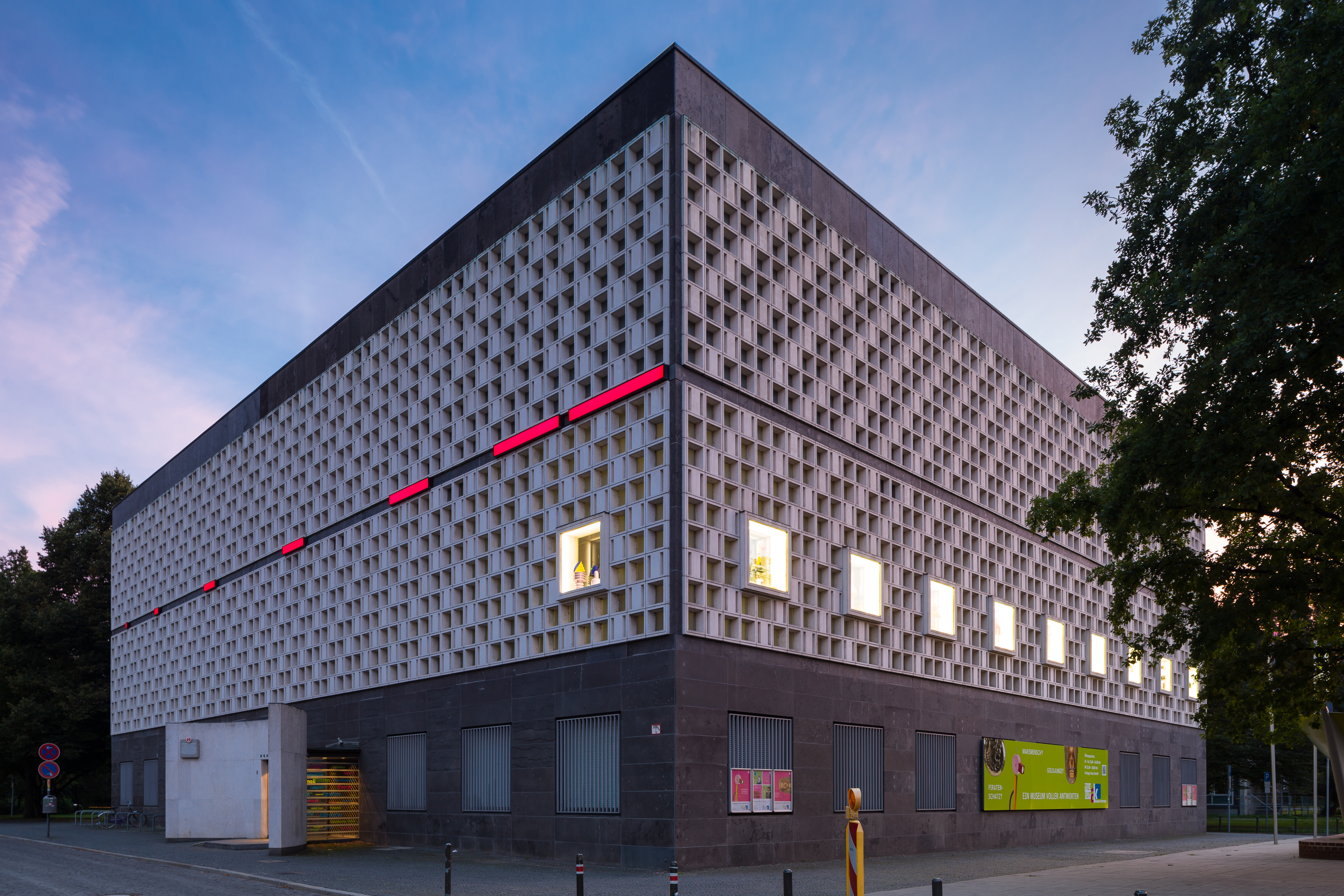
- Established: 1889; 137 years ago
- Location: Hanover, Germany
- Coordinates: 52°22′05″N 9°44′11″E
- Website: www.hannover.de/Museum-August-Kestner

The August Kestner Museum (German: Museum August Kestner), previously Kestner-Museum, is a museum in Hanover, Germany. Founded in 1889, the museum was renamed in December 2007 to avoid confusion with the Kestnergesellschaft, a local art gallery.

The museum centres on the collections of August Kestner and his nephew Hermann Kestner, later followed by the collections of Friedrich Culemann and Friedrich Wilhelm von Bissing. It contains four different categories of antiquities: Ancient Egypt, Classical Antiquity, Numismatics and Handicraft.
