= Eye of Horus =

Ancient Egyptian symbol of protection, royal power and good health

The left wedjat-eye, symbolizing the Eye of Horus

The Eye of Horus, usually depicted as left wedjat-eye (paired with the Eye of Ra, right wedjat-eye), (Note: The multiple meanings of the Eye of Horus sometimes overlapped with the meanings of the Eye of Ra, which was a distinct but related concept in Egyptian mythology.) is a concept and symbol in ancient Egyptian religion that represents well-being, healing, and protection. It derives from the mythical conflict between the god Horus with his rival Set, in which Set tore out or destroyed one or both of Horus's eyes and the eye was subsequently healed or returned to Horus with the assistance of another deity, such as Thoth. Horus subsequently offered the eye to his deceased father Osiris, and its revitalizing power sustained Osiris in the afterlife. The Eye of Horus was thus equated with funerary offerings, as well as with all the offerings given to deities in temple ritual. It could also represent other concepts, such as the moon, whose waxing and waning was likened to the injury and restoration of the eye.

The Eye of Horus symbol, a stylized eye with distinctive markings, was believed to have protective magical power and appeared frequently in ancient Egyptian art. It was one of the most common motifs for amulets, remaining in use from the Old Kingdom (c. 2686–2181 BC) to the Roman period (30 BC – 641 AD). Pairs of Horus eyes were painted on coffins during the First Intermediate Period (c. 2181–2055 BC) and Middle Kingdom (c. 2055–1650 BC). Other contexts where the symbol appeared include on carved stone stelae and on the bows of boats. To some extent the symbol was adopted by the people of regions neighboring Egypt, such as Syria, Canaan, and especially Nubia.

The eye symbol was also rendered as a hieroglyph (𓂀). Egyptologists have long believed that hieroglyphs representing pieces of the symbol stand for fractions in ancient Egyptian mathematics, although this hypothesis has been challenged.

== Origins ==
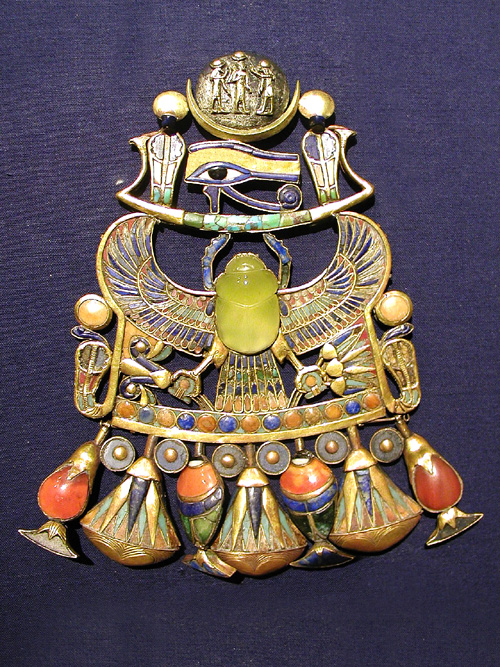
Amulet from the tomb of Tutankhamun, fourteenth century BC, incorporating the Eye of Horus beneath a disk and crescent symbol representing the moon

The ancient Egyptian god Horus was a sky deity, and many Egyptian texts say that Horus's right eye was the sun and his left eye the moon. The solar eye and lunar eye were sometimes equated with the red and white crown of Egypt, respectively. Some texts treat the Eye of Horus seemingly interchangeably with the Eye of Ra, which in other contexts is an extension of the power of the sun god Ra and is often personified as a goddess. The Egyptologist Richard H. Wilkinson believes the two eyes of Horus gradually became distinguished as the lunar Eye of Horus and the solar Eye of Ra. Other Egyptologists, however, argue that no text clearly equates the eyes of Horus with the sun and moon until the New Kingdom (c. 1550–1070 BC); Rolf Krauss argues that the Eye of Horus originally represented Venus as the morning star and evening star and only later became equated with the moon.

Katja Goebs argues that the myths surrounding the Eye of Horus and the Eye of Ra are based around the same mytheme, or core element of a myth, and that "rather than postulating a single, original myth of one cosmic body, which was then merged with others, it might be more fruitful to think in terms of a (flexible) myth based on the structural relationship of an Object that is missing, or located far from its owner". In the myths surrounding the Eye of Ra, the goddess flees Ra and is brought back by another deity. In the case of the Eye of Horus, the eye is usually missing because of Horus's conflict with his arch-rival, the god Set, in their struggle for the kingship of Egypt after the death of Horus's father Osiris.

== Mythology ==
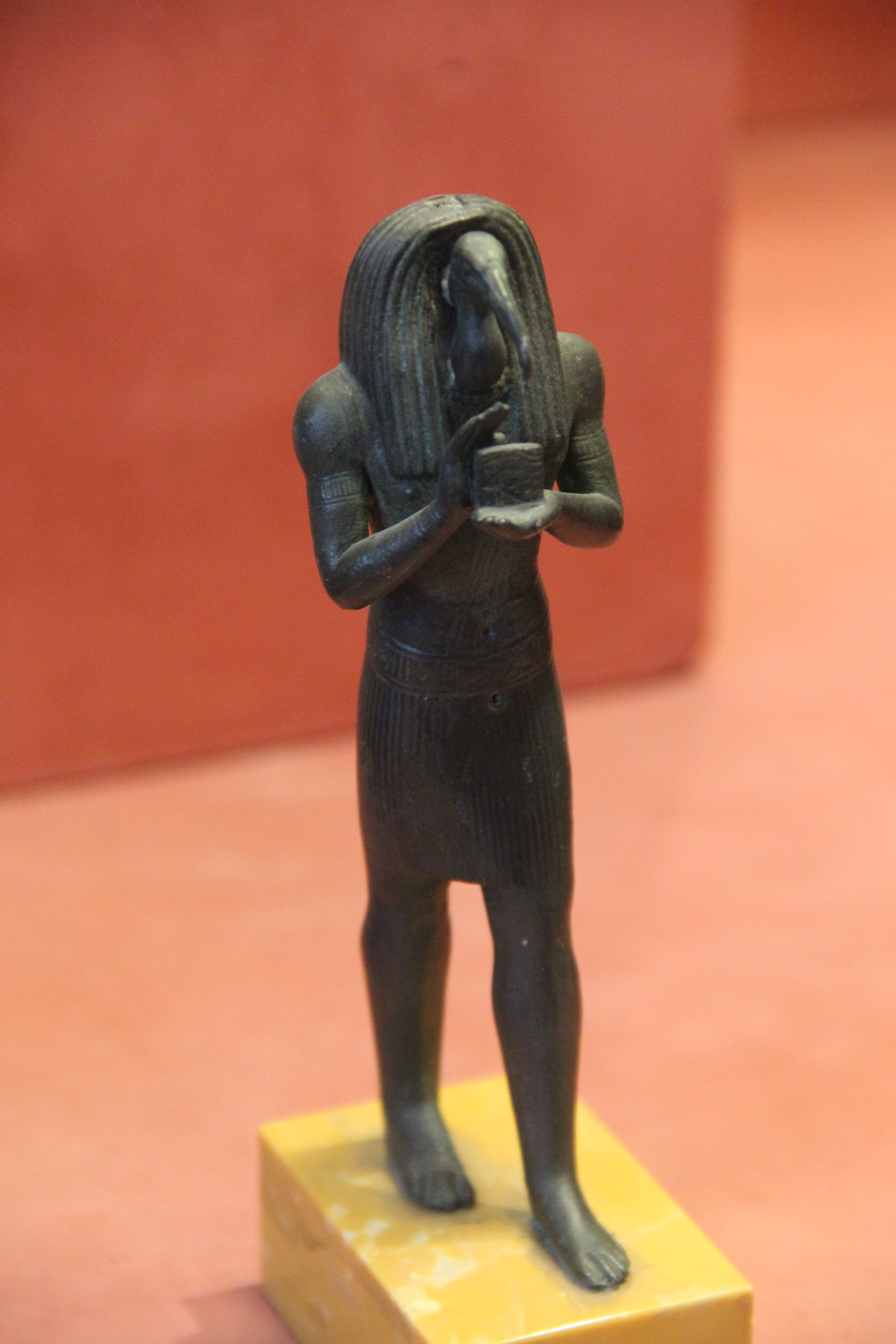
Statuette of Thoth, in the form of an ibis-man, holding the left wedjat-eye

The Pyramid Texts, which date to the late Old Kingdom (c. 2686–2181 BC), are one of the earliest sources for Egyptian myth. They prominently feature the conflict between Horus and Set, and the Eye of Horus is mentioned in about a quarter of the utterances that make up the Pyramid Texts. In these texts, Set is said to have stolen the Eye of Horus, and sometimes to have trampled and eaten it. Horus nevertheless takes back the eye, usually by force. The texts often mention the theft of Horus's eye along with the loss of Set's testicles, an injury that is also healed. The conflict over the eye is mentioned and elaborated in many texts from later times. In most of these texts, the eye is restored by another deity, most commonly Thoth, who was said to have made peace between Horus and Set. In some versions, Thoth is said to have reassembled the eye after Set tore it to pieces. In the Book of the Dead from the New Kingdom, Set is said to have taken the form of a black boar when striking Horus's eye. In "The Contendings of Horus and Set", a text from the late New Kingdom that relates the conflict as a short narrative, Set tears out both of Horus's eyes and buries them, and the next morning they grow into lotuses. Here it is the goddess Hathor who restores Horus's eyes, by anointing them with the milk of a gazelle. In Papyrus Jumilhac, a mythological text from early in the Ptolemaic Period (332–30 BC), Horus's mother Isis waters the buried pair of eyes, causing them to grow into the first grape vines.

The restoration of the eye was often referred to as "filling" the eye. Hathor filled Horus's eye sockets with the gazelle's milk, while texts from temples of the Greco-Roman era said that Thoth, together with a group of fourteen other deities, filled the eye with specific plants and minerals. The process of filling the Eye of Horus was likened to the waxing of the moon, and the fifteen deities in the Greco-Roman texts represented the fifteen days from the new moon to the full moon.

The Egyptologist Herman te Velde suggests that the Eye of Horus is linked with another episode in the conflict between the two gods, in which Set subjects Horus to a sexual assault and, in retaliation, Isis and Horus cause Set to ingest Horus's semen. This episode is narrated most clearly in "The Contendings of Horus and Set", in which Horus's semen appears on Set's forehead as a golden disk, which Thoth places on his own head. Other references in Egyptian texts imply that in some versions of the myth it was Thoth himself who came forth from Set's head after Set was impregnated by Horus's semen, and a passage in the Pyramid Texts says the Eye of Horus came from Set's forehead. Te Velde argues that the disk that emerges from Set's head is the Eye of Horus. If so, the episodes of mutilation and sexual abuse would form a single story, in which Set assaults Horus and loses semen to him, Horus retaliates and impregnates Set, and Set comes into possession of Horus's eye when it appears on Set's head. Because Thoth is a moon deity in addition to his other functions, it would make sense, according to te Velde, for Thoth to emerge in the form of the eye and step in to make peace between the feuding deities.

Beginning in the New Kingdom, the Eye of Horus was known as the wḏꜣt (often rendered as wedjat or udjat), meaning the "whole", "completed", or "uninjured" eye. It is unclear whether the term wḏꜣt refers to the eye that was destroyed and restored, or to the one that Set left unharmed.

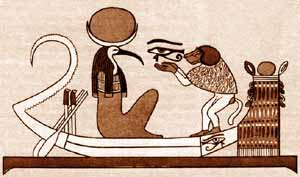
Drawing of Thoth, in the form of a baboon, holding the left wedjat-eye

Upon becoming king after Set's defeat, Horus gives offerings to his deceased father, thus reviving and sustaining him in the afterlife. This act was the mythic prototype for the offerings to the dead that were a major part of ancient Egyptian funerary customs. It also influenced the conception of offering rites that were performed on behalf of deities in temples. Among the offerings Horus gives is his own eye, which Osiris consumes. The eye, as part of Osiris's son, is ultimately derived from Osiris himself. Therefore, the eye in this context represents the Egyptian conception of offerings. The gods were responsible for the existence of all the goods that they were offered, so offerings were part of the gods' own substance. In receiving offerings, deities were replenished by their own life force, as Osiris was when he consumed the Eye of Horus. In the Egyptian worldview, life was a force that originated with the gods and circulated through the world, so that by returning this force to the gods, offering rites maintained the flow of life. The offering of the eye to Osiris is another instance of the mytheme in which a deity in need receives an eye and is restored to well-being. The eye's restorative power meant the Egyptians considered it a symbol of protection against evil, in addition to its other meanings.

== In ritual ==
=== Offerings and festivals ===
In the Osiris myth, the offering of the Eye of Horus to Osiris was the prototype of all funerary offerings, and indeed of all offering rites, as the human giving an offering to a deity was likened to Horus and the deity receiving it was likened to Osiris. Moreover, the Egyptian word for "eye", jrt, resembled jrj, the word for "act", and through wordplay the Eye of Horus could thus be equated with any ritual act. For these reasons, the Eye of Horus symbolized all the sustenance given to the gods in the temple cult. The versions of the myth in which flowers or grapevines grow from the buried eyes reinforce the eye's relationship with ritual offerings, as the perfumes, food, and drink that were derived from these plants were commonly used in offering rites. The eye was often equated with maat, the Egyptian concept of cosmic order, which was dependent on the continuation of the temple cult and could likewise be equated with offerings of any kind.

The Egyptians observed several festivals in the course of each month that were based on the phases of the moon, such as the Blacked-out Moon Festival (the first of the month), the Monthly Festival (the second day), and the Half-Month Festival. During these festivals, living people gave offerings to the deceased. The festivals were frequently mentioned in funerary texts. Beginning in the time of the Coffin Texts from the Middle Kingdom (c. 2055–1650 BC), funerary texts parallel the progression of these festivals, and hence the waxing of the moon, with the healing of the Eye of Horus.

=== Healing texts ===
Ancient Egyptian medicine involved both practical treatments and rituals that invoked divine powers, and Egyptian medical papyri do not clearly distinguish the two. Healing rituals frequently equate patients with Horus, so the patient may be healed as Horus was in myth. For this reason, the Eye of Horus is frequently mentioned in such spells. The Hearst papyrus, for instance, equates the physician performing the ritual to "Thoth, the physician of the Eye of Horus" and equates the instrument with which the physician measures the medicine with "the measure with which Horus measured his eye". The Eye of Horus was particularly invoked as protection against eye disease. One text, Papyrus Leiden I 348, equates each part of a person's body with a deity in order to protect it. The left eye is equated with the Eye of Horus.

== Symbol ==
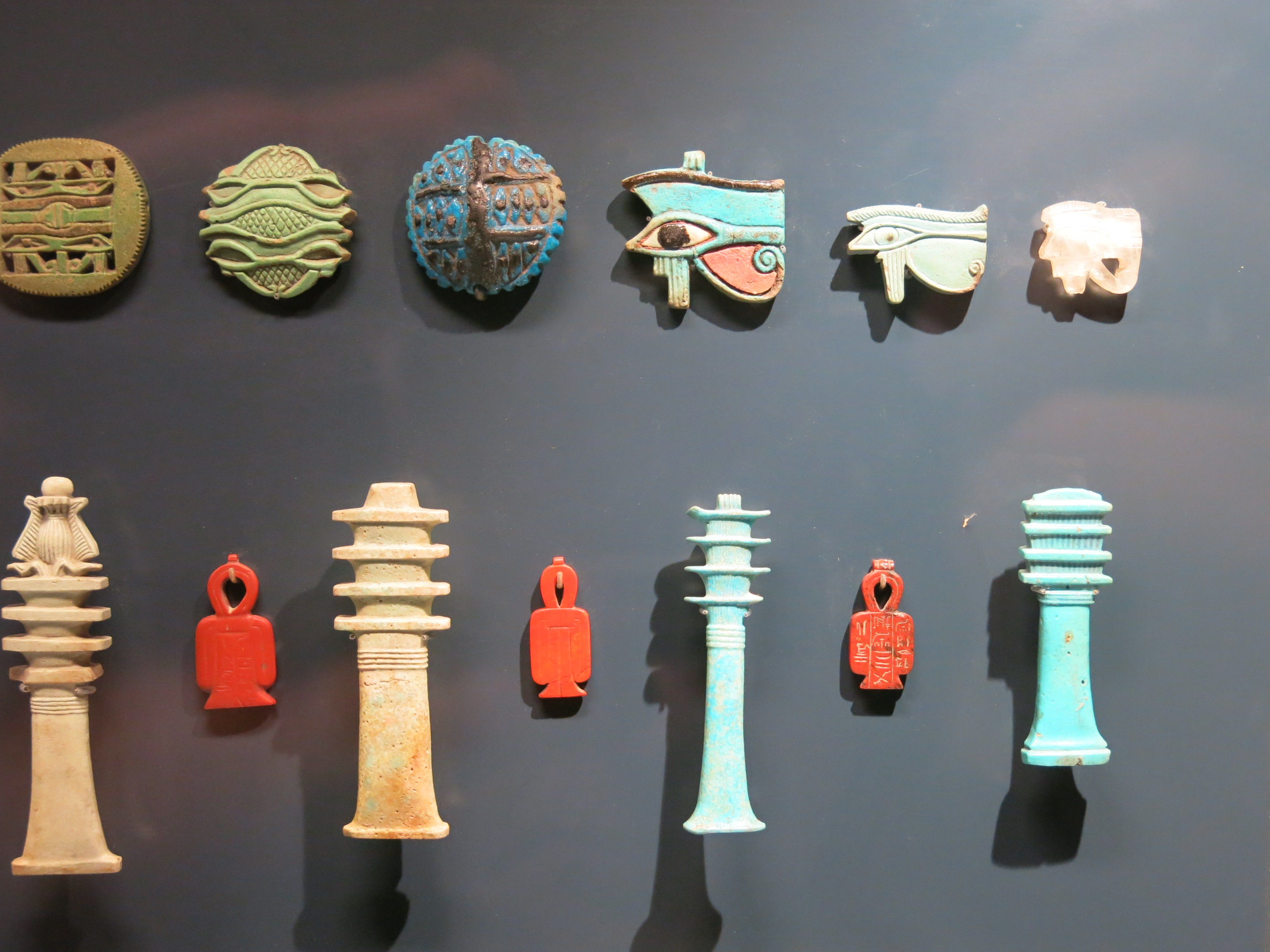
Wedjat-eyes among a variety of ancient Egyptian amulets

Horus was represented as a falcon, such as a lanner or peregrine falcon, or as a human with a falcon head. The Eye of Horus is a stylized human or falcon eye. The symbol often includes an eyebrow, a dark line extending behind the rear corner of the eye, a cheek marking below the center or forward corner of the eye, and a line extending below and toward the rear of the eye that ends in a curl or spiral. The cheek marking resembles that found on many falcons. The Egyptologist Richard H. Wilkinson suggests that the curling line is derived from the facial markings of the cheetah, which the Egyptians associated with the sky because the spots in its coat were likened to stars.

The stylized eye symbol was used interchangeably to represent the Eye of Ra. Egyptologists often simply refer to this symbol as the wedjat eye.

=== Amulets ===
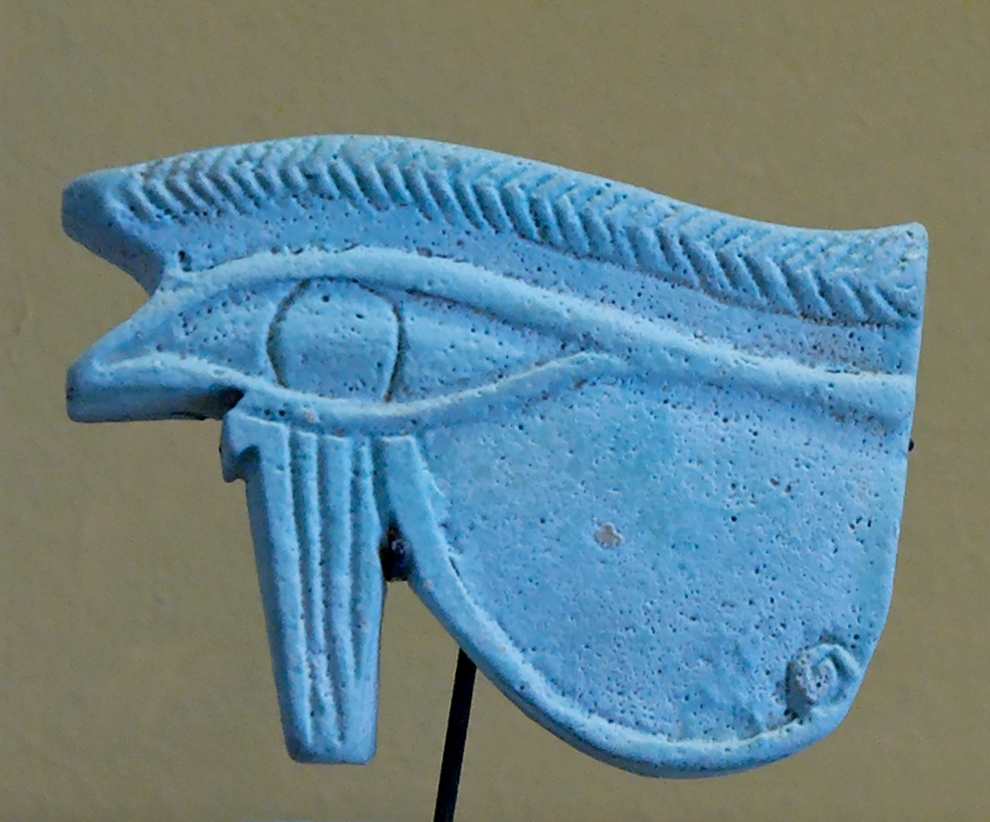
Egyptian faience wedjat amulet, Louvre Museum

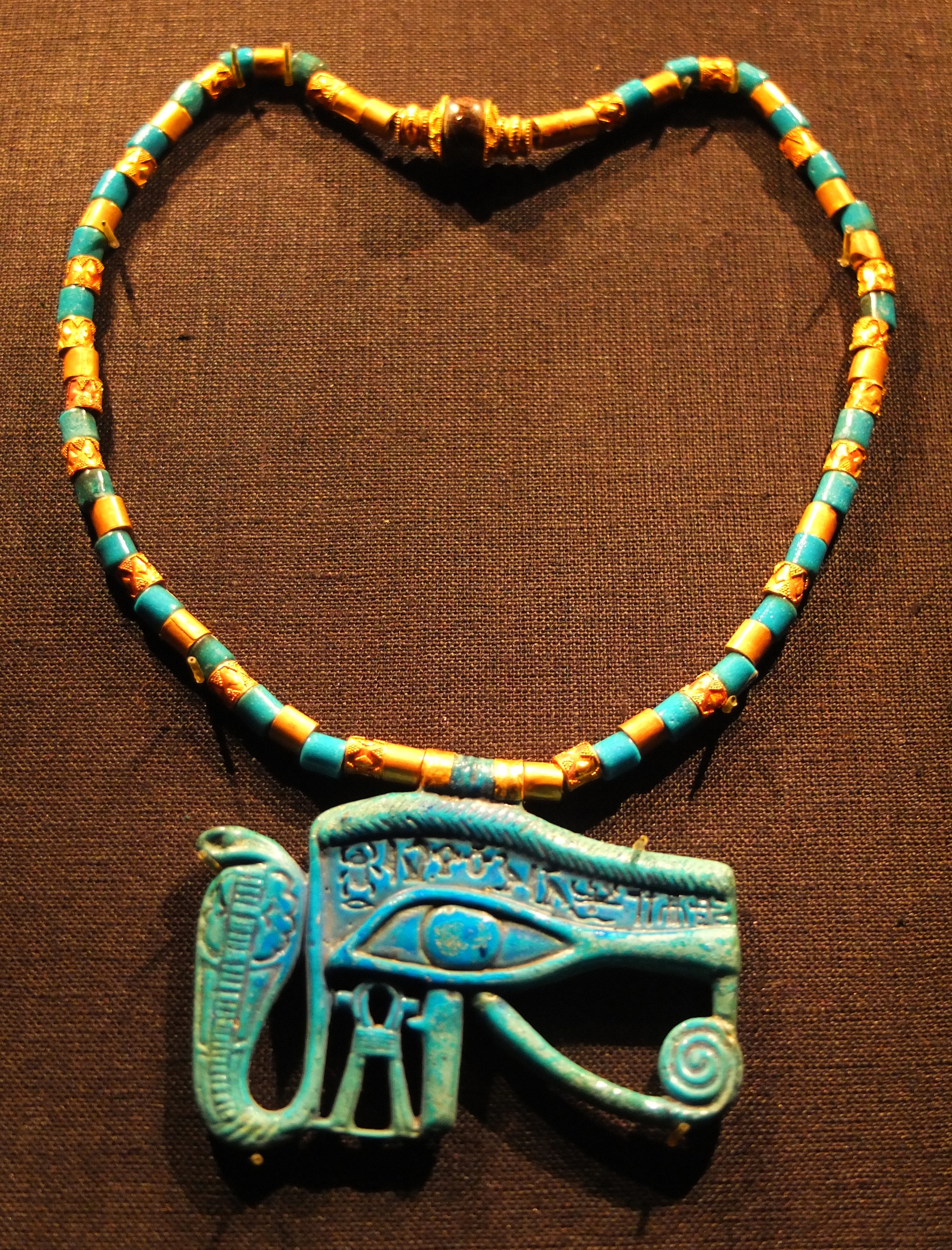
Egyptian faience wedjat amulet with a cobra, Cairo Museum

Amulets in the shape of the wedjat eye first appeared in the late Old Kingdom and continued to be produced up to Roman times. Ancient Egyptians were usually buried with amulets, and the Eye of Horus was one of the most consistently popular forms of amulet. It is one of the few types commonly found on Old Kingdom mummies, and it remained in widespread use over the next two thousand years, even as the number and variety of funerary amulets greatly increased. Up until the New Kingdom, funerary wedjat amulets tended to be placed on the chest, whereas during and after the New Kingdom they were commonly placed over the incision through which the body's internal organs had been removed during the mummification process.

Wedjat amulets were made from a wide variety of materials, including Egyptian faience, glass, gold, and semiprecious stones such as lapis lazuli. Their form also varied greatly. These amulets could represent right or left eyes, and the eye could be formed of openwork, incorporated into a plaque, or reduced to little more than an outline of the eye shape, with minimal decoration to indicate the position of the pupil and brow. In the New Kingdom, elaborate forms appeared: a uraeus, or rearing cobra, could appear at the front of the eye; the rear spiral could become a bird's tail feathers; and the cheek mark could be a bird's leg or a human arm. Cobras and felines often represented the Eye of Ra, so Eye of Horus amulets that incorporate uraei or feline body parts may represent the relationship between the two eyes, as may amulets that bear the wedjat eye on one side and the figure of a goddess on the other. The Third Intermediate Period (c. 1070–664 BC) saw still more complex designs, in which multiple small figures of animals or deities were inserted in the gaps between the parts of the eye, or in which the eyes were grouped into sets of four.

The eye symbol could also be incorporated into larger pieces of jewelry alongside other protective symbols, such as the ankh and djed signs and various emblems of deities. Beginning in the thirteenth century BC, glass beads bearing eye-like spots were strung on necklaces together with wedjat amulets, which may be the origin of the modern nazar, a type of bead meant to ward off the evil eye.

Sometimes temporary amulets were created for protective purposes in especially dangerous situations, such as illness or childbirth. Rubrics for ritual spells often instruct the practitioner to draw the wedjat eye on linen or papyrus to serve as a temporary amulet.

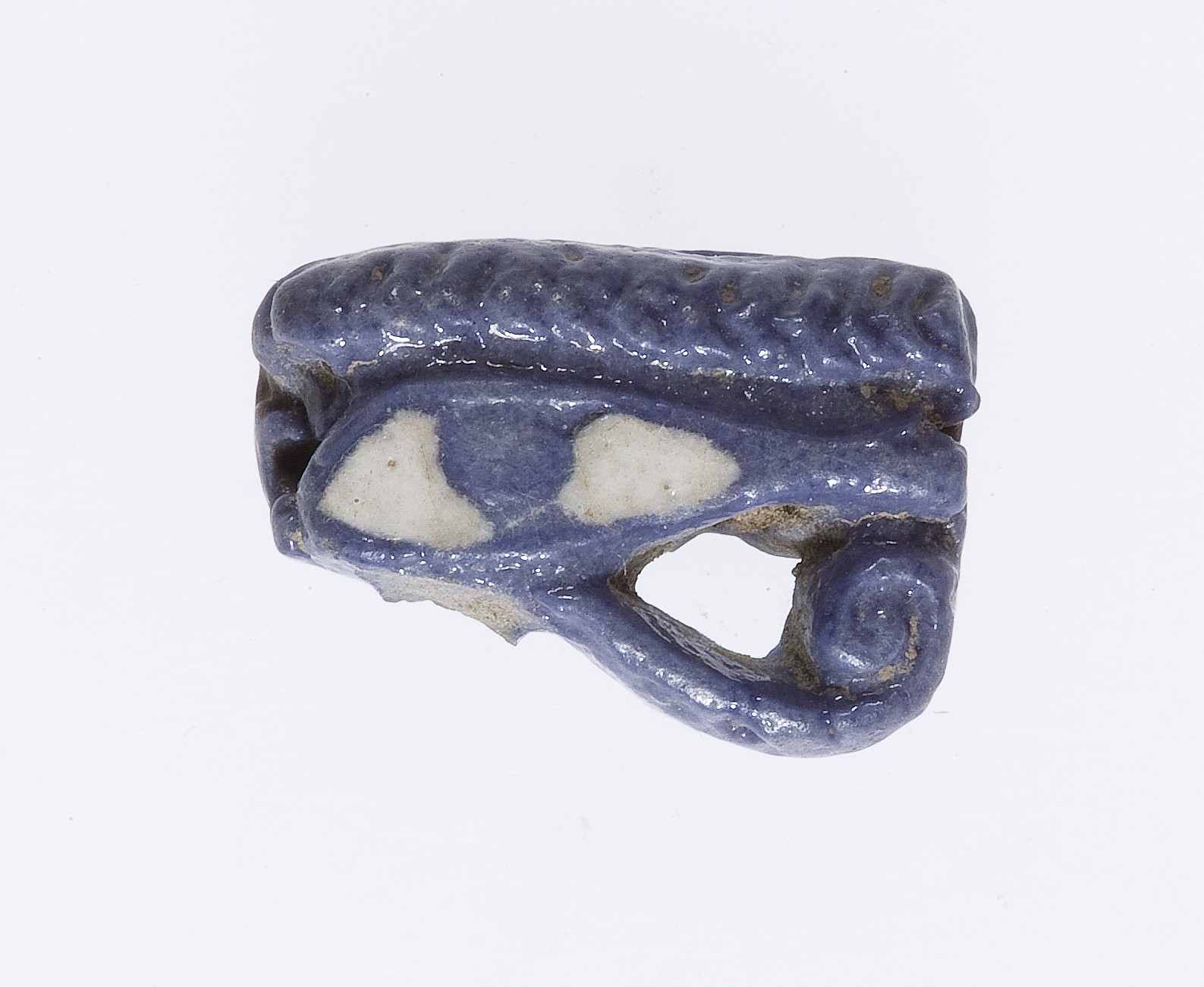
Wedjat amulet, c. 1390–1353 B.C., Metropolitan Museum of Art

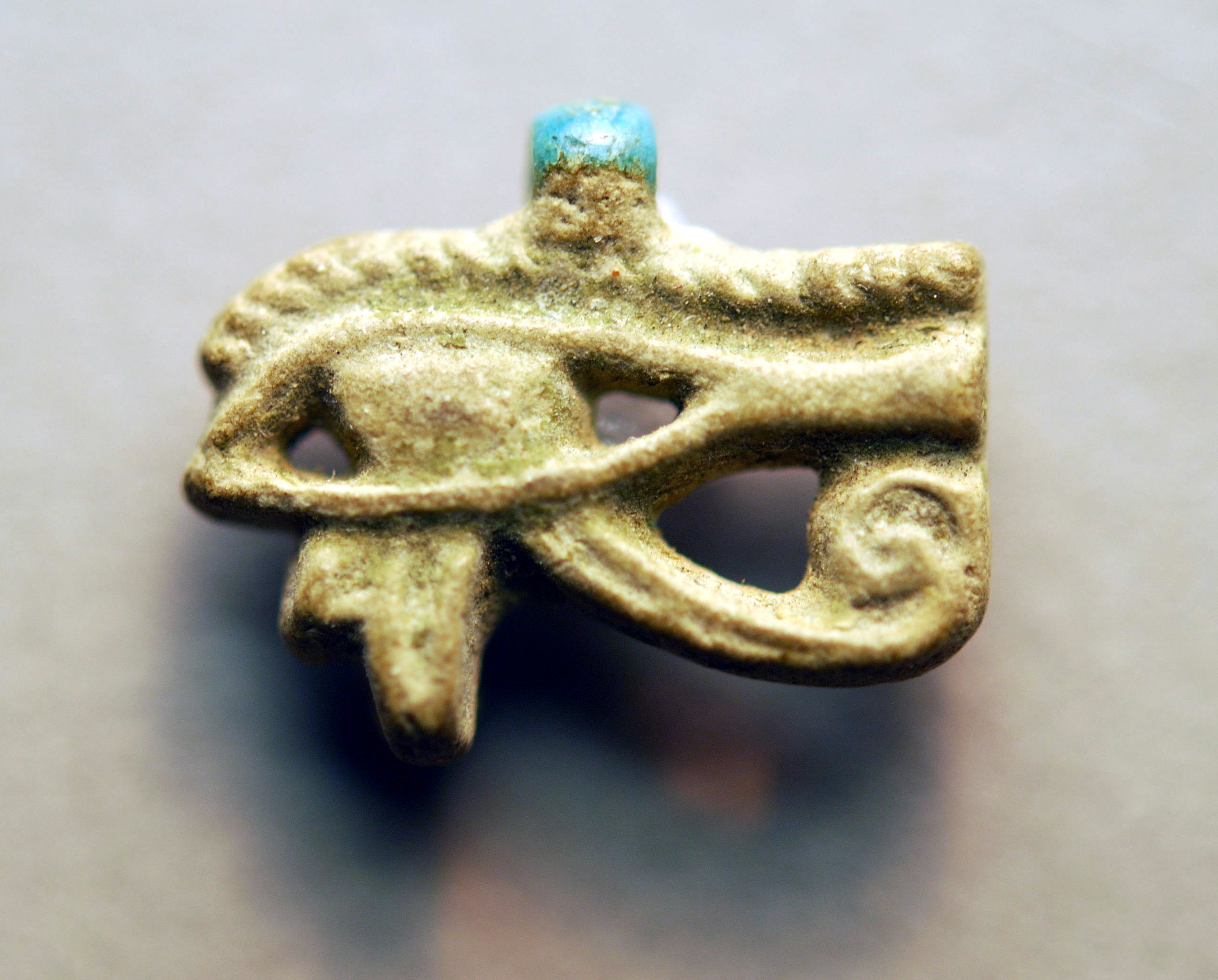
Wedjat amulet, c. 1390–1352 B.C., Metropolitan Museum of Art

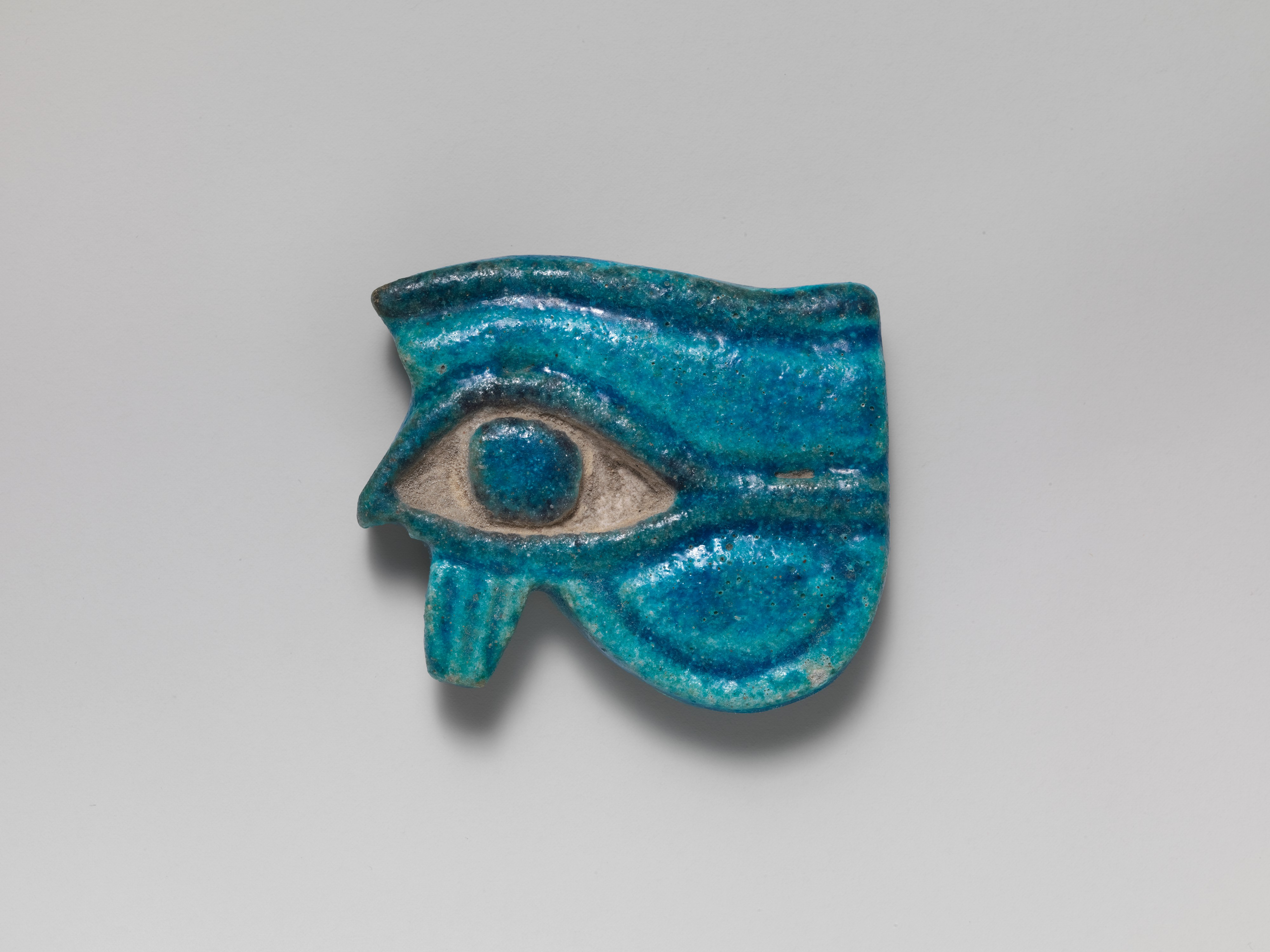
Egyptian faience wedjat amulet, c. 1090–900 B.C., Metropolitan Museum of Art

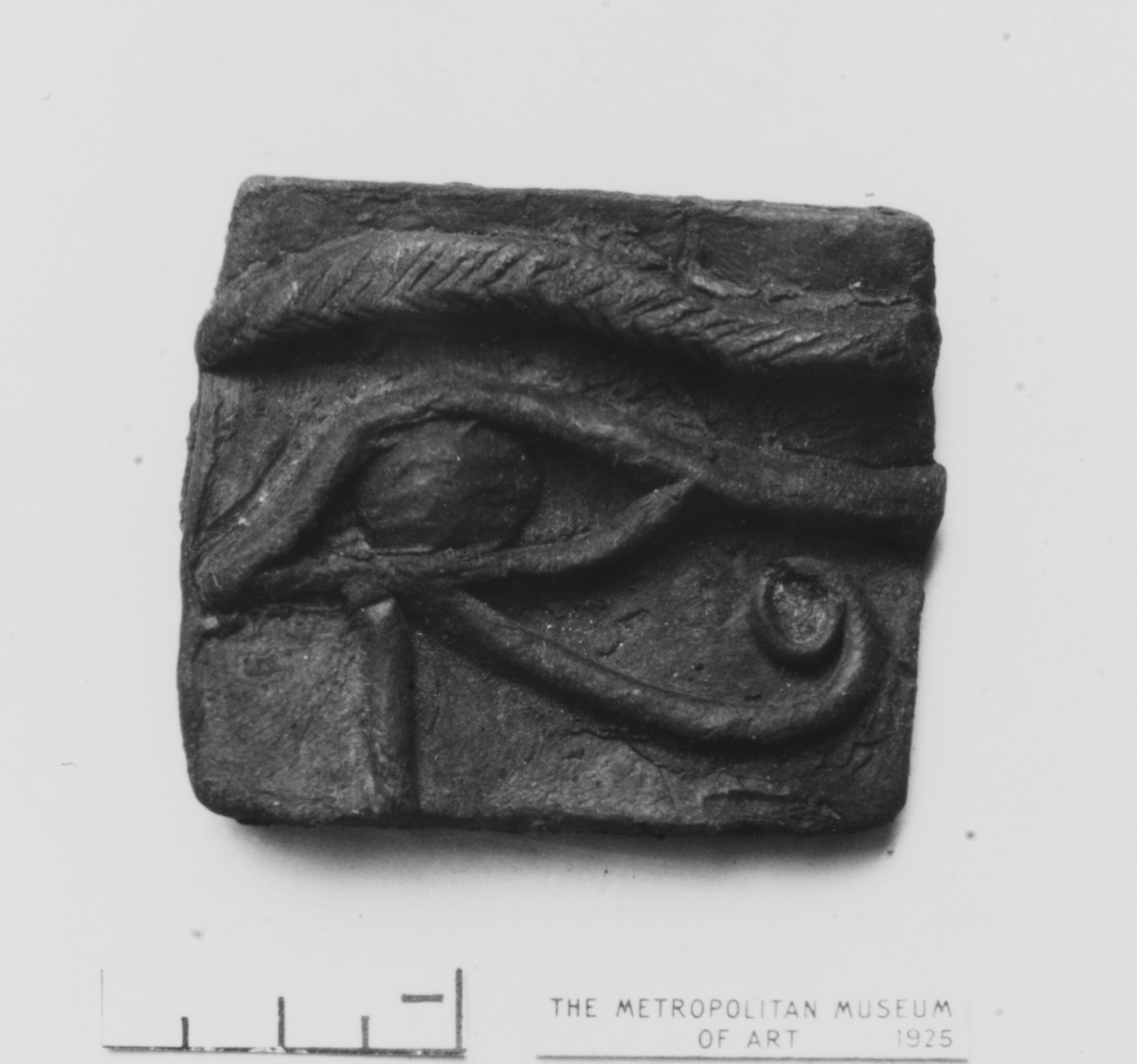
Wedjat plaque, c. 1070–945 B.C., Metropolitan Museum of Art

=== Other uses ===
Wedjat eyes appeared in a wide variety of contexts in Egyptian art. Coffins of the First Intermediate Period (c. 2181–2055 BC) and Middle Kingdom often included a pair of wedjat eyes painted on the left side. Mummies at this time were often turned to face left, suggesting that the eyes were meant to allow the deceased to see outside the coffin, but the eyes were probably also meant to ward off danger. Similarly, eyes of Horus were often painted on the bows of boats, which may have been meant to both protect the vessel and allow it to see the way ahead. Wedjat eyes were sometimes portrayed with wings, hovering protectively over kings or deities. Stelae, or carved stone slabs, were often inscribed with wedjat eyes. In some periods of Egyptian history, only deities or kings could be portrayed directly beneath the winged sun symbol that often appeared in the lunettes of stelae, and Eyes of Horus were placed above figures of common people. The symbol could also be incorporated into tattoos, as demonstrated by the mummy of a woman from the late New Kingdom that was decorated with elaborate tattoos, including several wedjat eyes.

Some cultures neighboring Egypt adopted the wedjat symbol for use in their own art. Some Egyptian artistic motifs became widespread in art from Canaan and Syria during the Middle Bronze Age. Art of this era sometimes incorporated the wedjat, though it was much more rare than other Egyptian symbols such as the ankh. In contrast, the wedjat appeared frequently in art of the Kingdom of Kush in Nubia, in the first millennium BC and early first millennium AD, demonstrating Egypt's heavy influence upon Kush. Down to the present day, eyes are painted on the bows of ships in many Mediterranean countries, a custom that may descend from the use of the wedjat eye on boats.

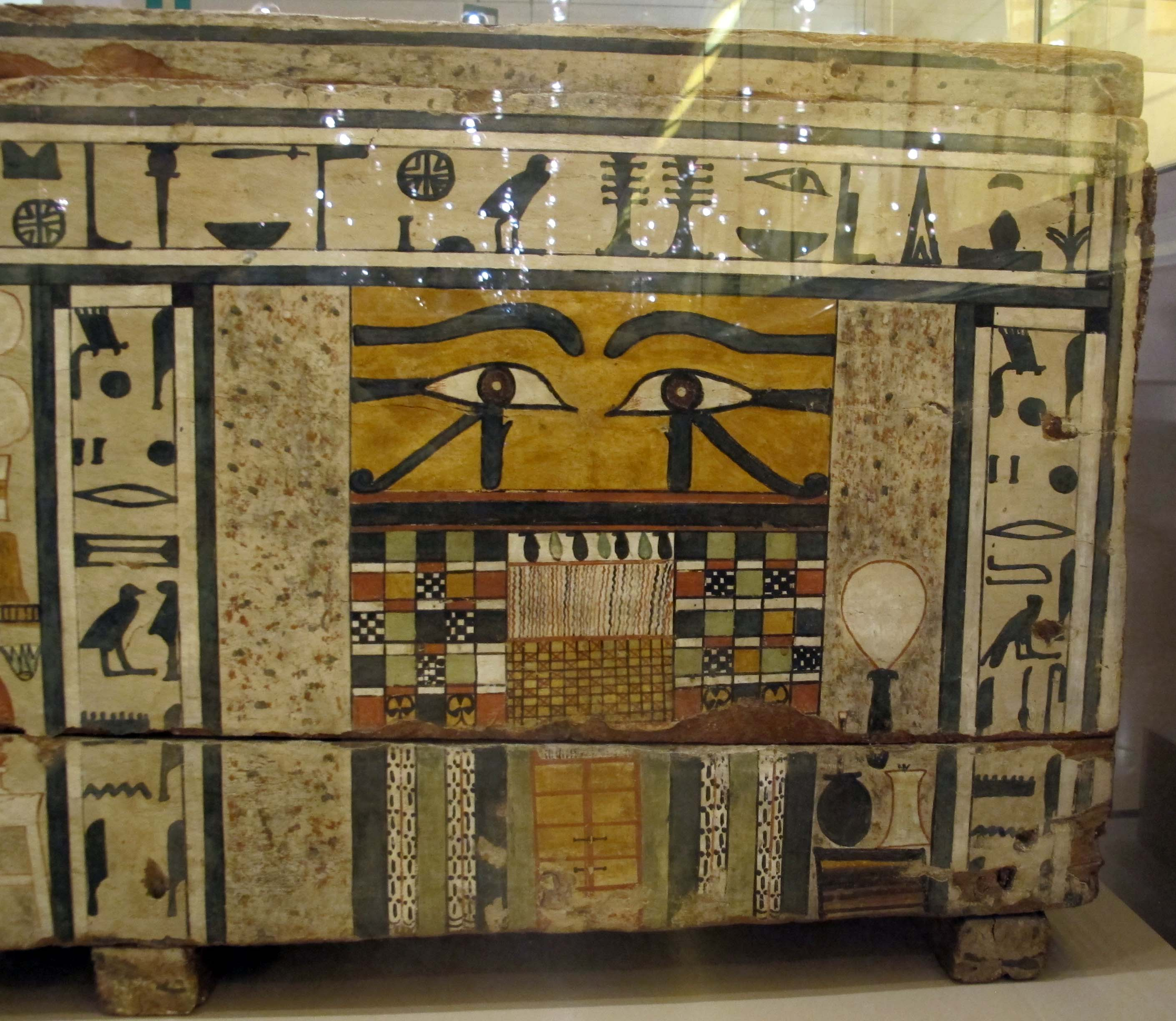
Wedjat eyes on the coffin of Irinimenpu, twentieth to seventeenth century BC

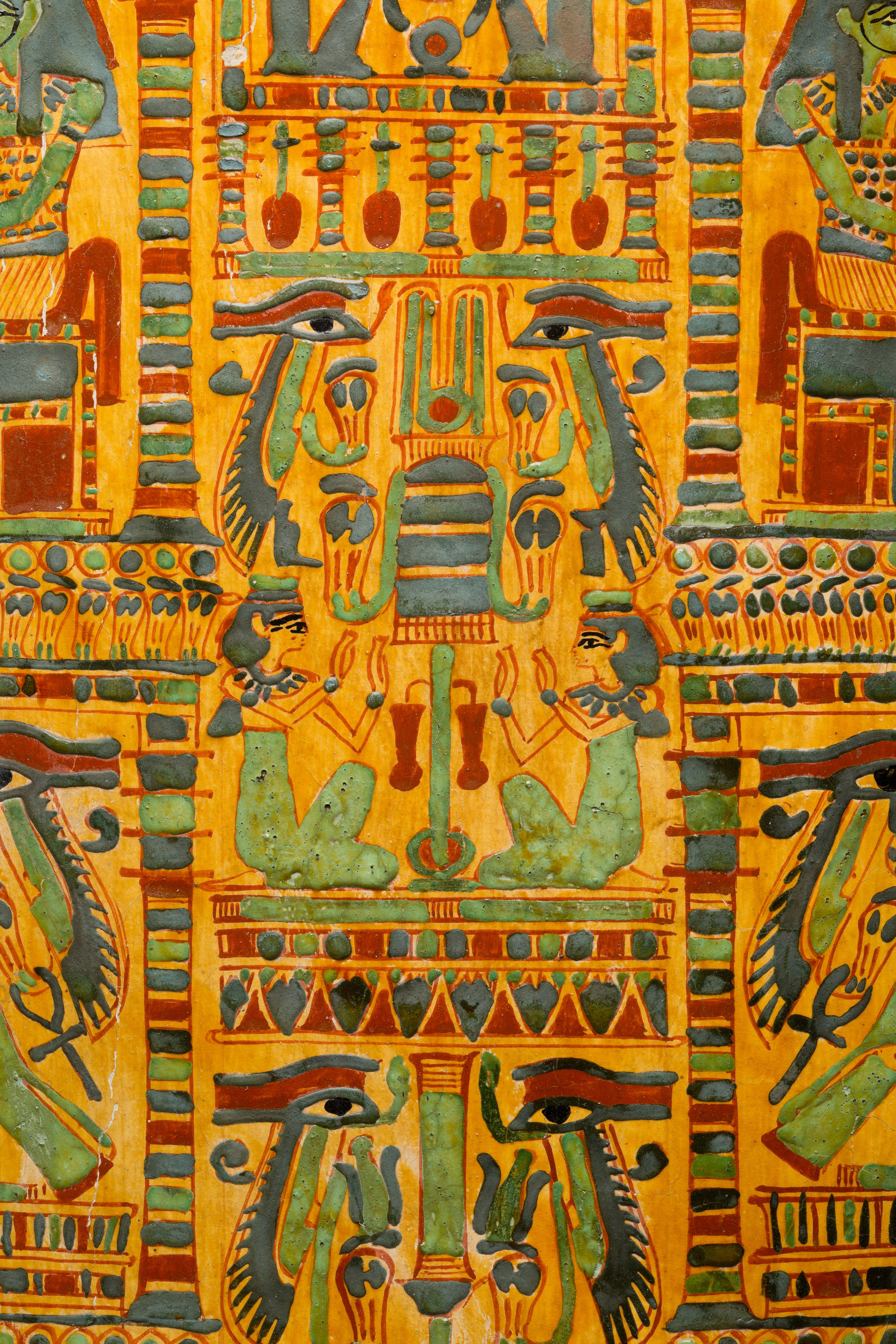
Winged wedjat eyes on the coffin of Henettawy, tenth century BC

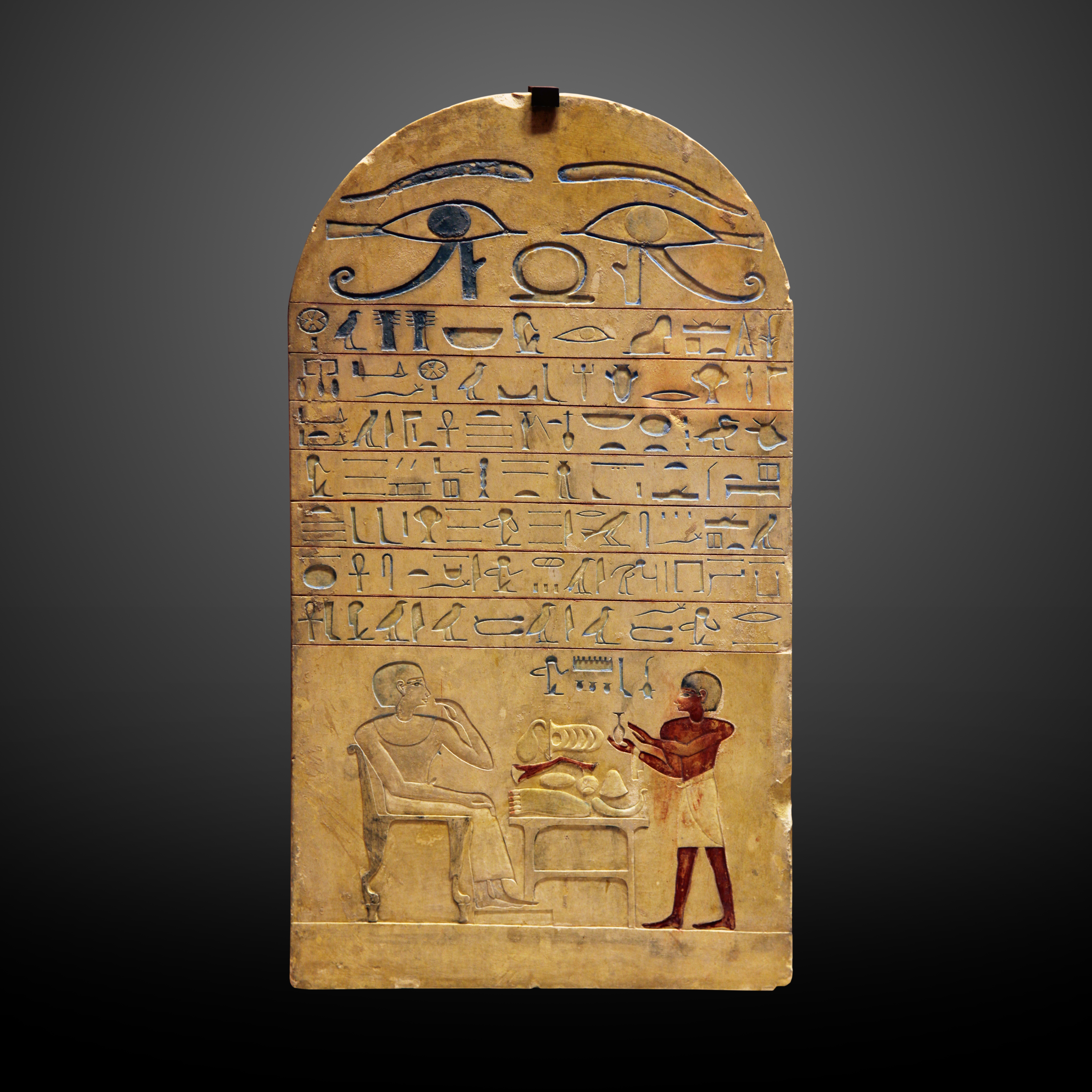
Wedjat eyes atop the stela of Uhemmenu, sixteenth century BC

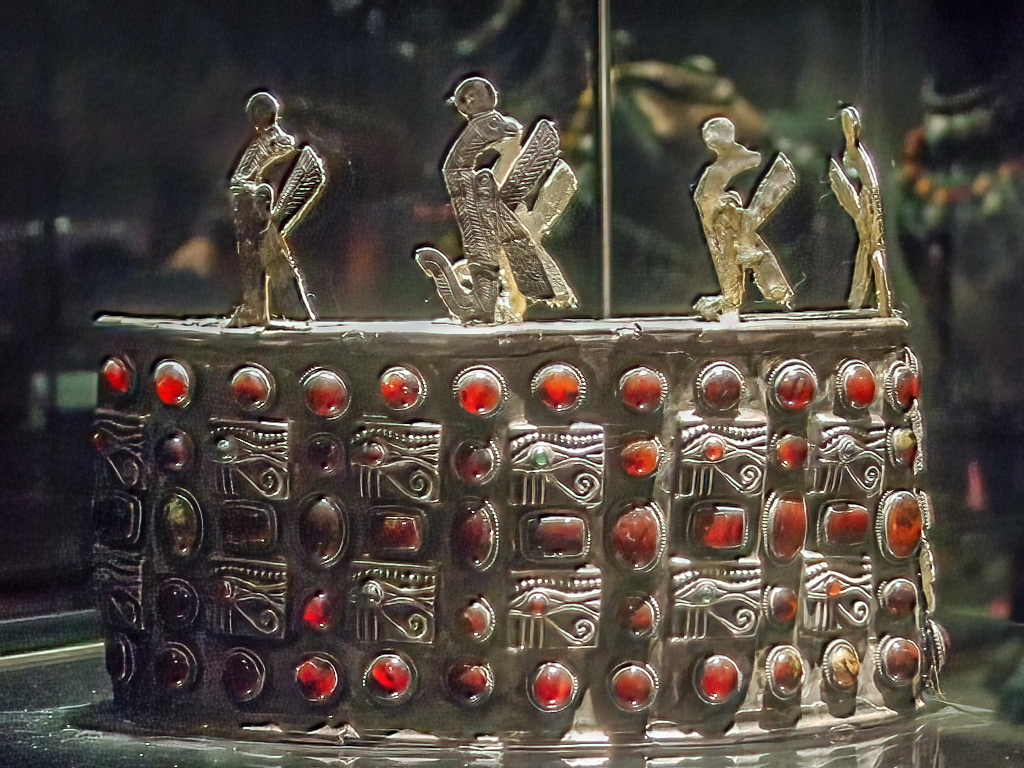
Crown from the post-Meroitic period in Nubia, c. 350–600 AD, incorporating multiple wedjat eyes

=== Hieroglyphic form ===
D10
wedjat or Eye of Horus
in hieroglyphs

Gardiner: D10

A hieroglyphic version of the wedjat symbol, labeled D10 in the list of hieroglyphic signs drawn up by the Egyptologist Alan Gardiner, was used in writing as a determinative or ideogram for the Eye of Horus.

The Egyptians sometimes used signs that represented pieces of the wedjat eye hieroglyph. In 1911, the Egyptologist Georg Möller noted that on New Kingdom "votive cubits", inscribed stone objects with a length of one cubit, these hieroglyphs were inscribed together with similarly shaped symbols in the hieratic writing system, a cursive writing system whose signs derived from hieroglyphs. The hieratic signs stood for fractions of a hekat, the basic Egyptian measure of volume. Möller hypothesized that the Horus-eye hieroglyphs were the original hieroglyphic forms of the hieratic fraction signs, and that the inner corner of the eye stood for 1/2, the pupil for 1/4, the eyebrow for 1/8, the outer corner for 1/16, the curling line for 1/32, and the cheek mark for 1/64. In 1923, T. Eric Peet pointed out that the hieroglyphs representing pieces of the eye are not found before the New Kingdom, and he suggested that the hieratic fraction signs had a separate origin but were reinterpreted during the New Kingdom to have a connection with the Eye of Horus. In the same decade, Möller's hypothesis was included in standard reference works on the Egyptian language, such as Ägyptische Grammatik by Adolf Erman and Egyptian Grammar by Alan Gardiner. Gardiner's treatment of the subject suggested that the parts of the eye were used to represent fractions because in myth the eye was torn apart by Set and later made whole. Egyptologists accepted Gardiner's interpretation for decades afterward.

Jim Ritter, a historian of science and mathematics, analyzed the shape of the hieratic signs through Egyptian history in 2002. He concluded that "the further back we go the further the hieratic signs diverge from their supposed Horus-eye counterparts", thus undermining Möller's hypothesis. He also reexamined the votive cubits and argued that they do not clearly equate the Eye of Horus signs with the hieratic fractions, so even Peet's weaker form of the hypothesis was unlikely to be correct. Nevertheless, the 2014 edition of James P. Allen's Middle Egyptian, an introductory book on the Egyptian language, still lists the pieces of the wedjat eye as representing fractions of a hekat.

The hieroglyph for the Eye of Horus is listed in the Egyptian Hieroglyphs block of the Unicode standard for encoding symbols in computing, as U+13080 (𓂀). The hieroglyphs for parts of the eye (𓂁, 𓂂, 𓂃, 𓂄, 𓂅, 𓂆, 𓂇) are listed as U+13081 through U+13087.

Character information
Preview	𓂀		𓂁		𓂂		𓂃		𓂄		𓂅		𓂆		𓂇	
Unicode name	EGYPTIAN HIEROGLYPH D010		EGYPTIAN HIEROGLYPH D011		EGYPTIAN HIEROGLYPH D012		EGYPTIAN HIEROGLYPH D013		EGYPTIAN HIEROGLYPH D014		EGYPTIAN HIEROGLYPH D015		EGYPTIAN HIEROGLYPH D016		EGYPTIAN HIEROGLYPH D017	
Encodings	decimal	hex	dec	hex	dec	hex	dec	hex	dec	hex	dec	hex	dec	hex	dec	hex
Unicode	77952	U+13080	77953	U+13081	77954	U+13082	77955	U+13083	77956	U+13084	77957	U+13085	77958	U+13086	77959	U+13087
UTF-8	240 147 130 128	F0 93 82 80	240 147 130 129	F0 93 82 81	240 147 130 130	F0 93 82 82	240 147 130 131	F0 93 82 83	240 147 130 132	F0 93 82 84	240 147 130 133	F0 93 82 85	240 147 130 134	F0 93 82 86	240 147 130 135	F0 93 82 87
UTF-16	55308 56448	D80C DC80	55308 56449	D80C DC81	55308 56450	D80C DC82	55308 56451	D80C DC83	55308 56452	D80C DC84	55308 56453	D80C DC85	55308 56454	D80C DC86	55308 56455	D80C DC87
Numeric character reference	&#77952;	&#x13080;	&#77953;	&#x13081;	&#77954;	&#x13082;	&#77955;	&#x13083;	&#77956;	&#x13084;	&#77957;	&#x13085;	&#77958;	&#x13086;	&#77959;	&#x13087;
