= Egyptian numerals =

Numerals used in Ancient Egypt

The system of ancient Egyptian numerals was used in Ancient Egypt from around 3000 BC until the early first millennium AD. It was a system of numeration based on multiples of ten, often rounded off to the higher power, written in hieroglyphs.

The Egyptians had no concept of a positional notation such as the decimal system. The hieratic form of numerals stressed an exact finite series notation, ciphered one-to-one onto the Egyptian alphabet.

== Digits and numbers ==
The following hieroglyphs were used to denote powers of ten:

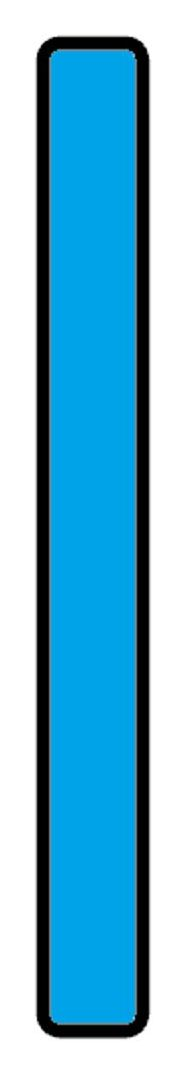
1
Z15
𓏤
Single stroke

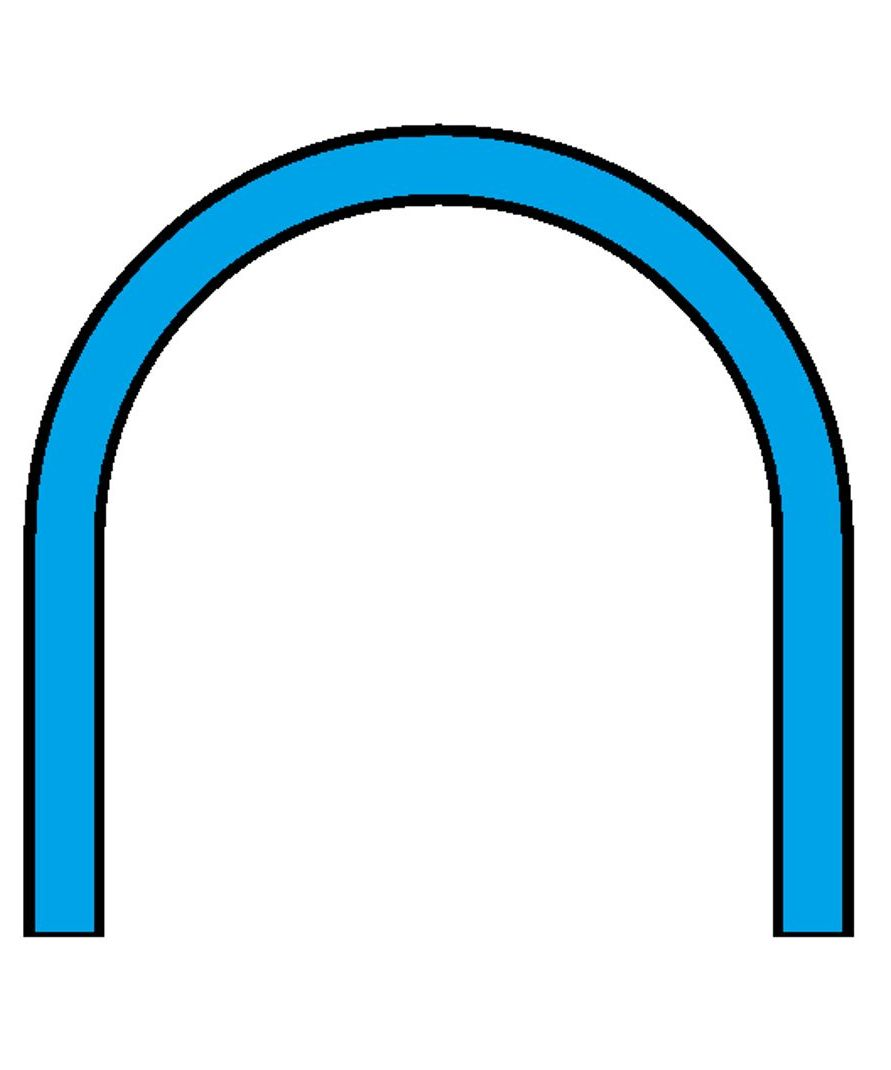
10
V20
𓎆
Cattle hobble

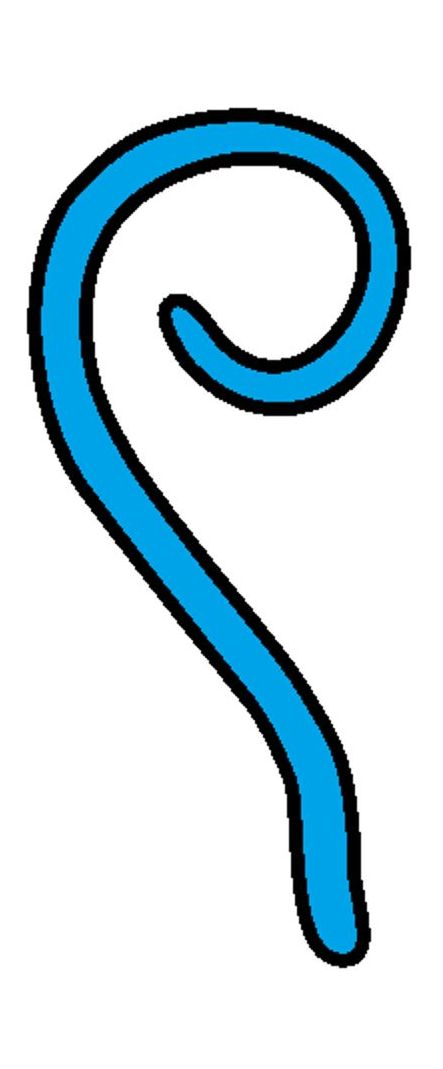
100
V1
𓍢
Coil of rope

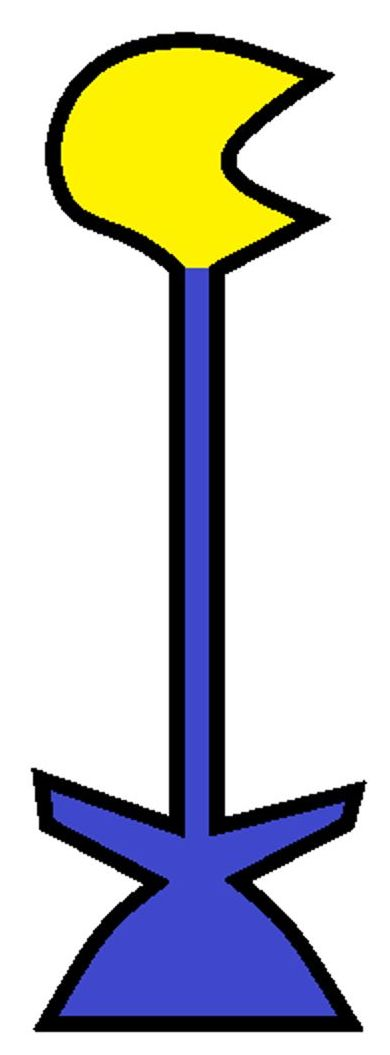
1,000
M12
𓆼
Water lily
(also called lotus)

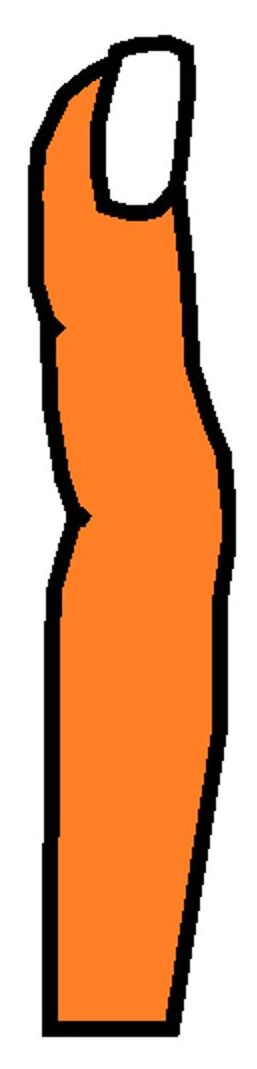
10,000
D50
𓂭
Bent finger

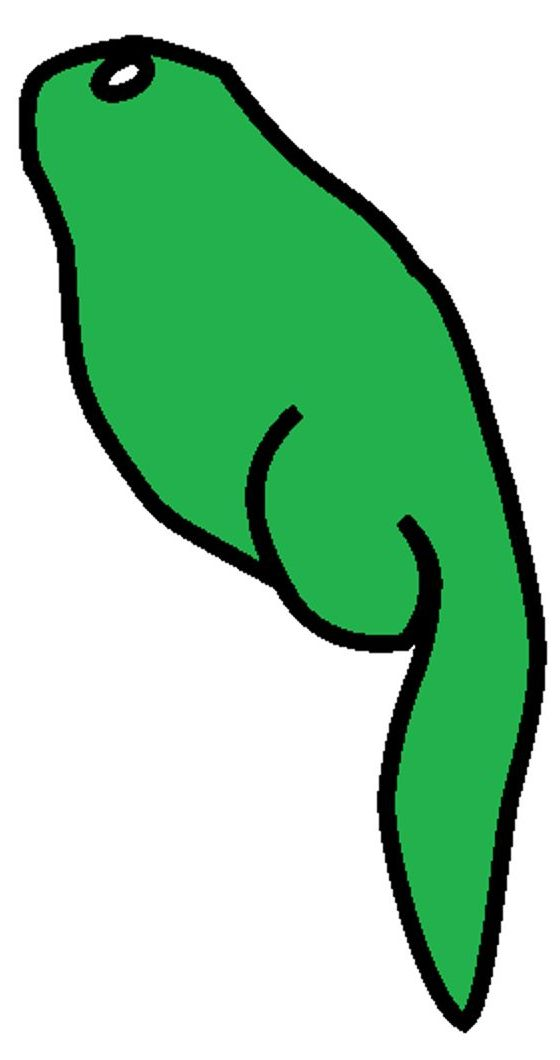
100,000
I8
𓆐
Tadpole

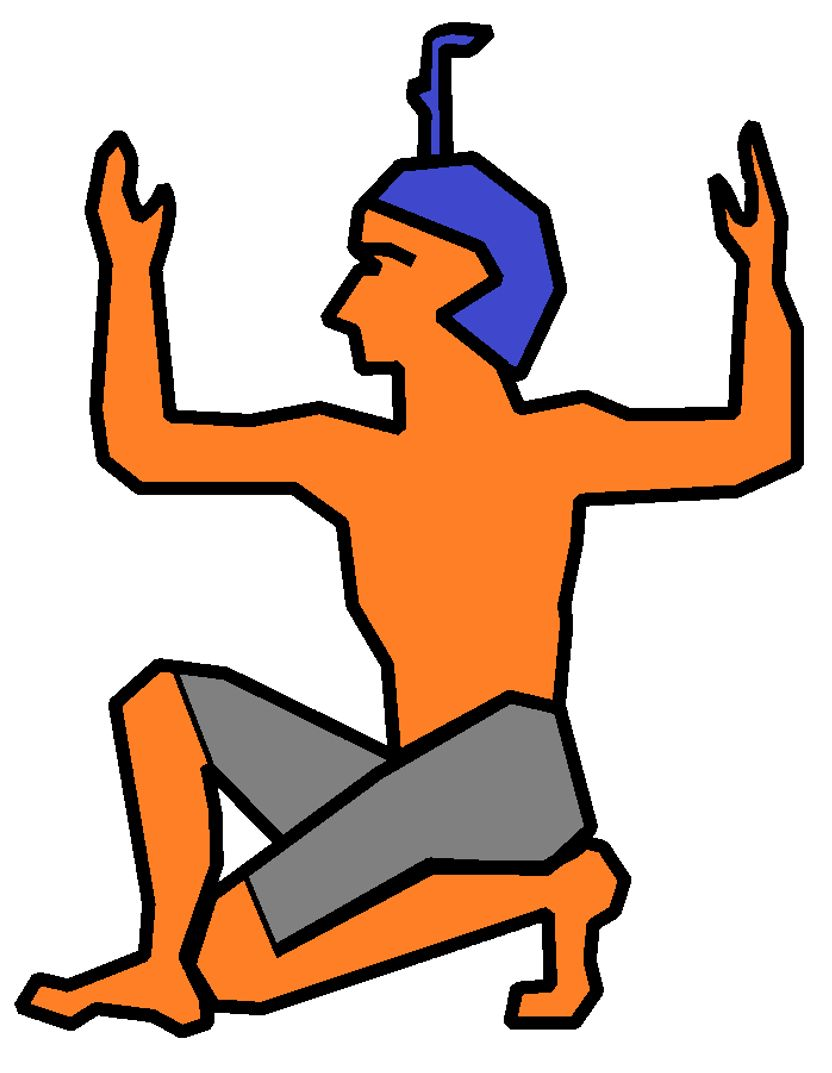
1,000,000
C11
𓁨
Heh

Multiples of these values were expressed by repeating the symbol as many times as needed. For instance, a stone carving from Karnak shows the number 4,622 as:

M12 M12 M12 M12 V1 V1 V1 V1 V1 V1 V20 V20 Z1 Z1

Egyptian hieroglyphs could be written in both directions (and even vertically). In this example the symbols decrease in value from top to bottom and from left to right. On the original stone carving, it is right-to-left, and the signs are thus reversed.

== Zero ==
There was no symbol or concept of zero as a placeholder in Egyptian numeration and zero was not used in calculations. The symbol nfr:

F35

meaning "good", "complete", "beautiful" served two similar, albeit non-mathematical, purposes:

- in a papyrus listing the court expenses, c. 1740 BC, it indicated a fulfilled balance;
- in setting marks for the Nyuserre pyramid and Mastabat al-Fir'aun, nfr is used to indicate the architectural baseline: height and depths are measured "above nfr" or "below nfr" respectively.

Mathematician and historian Carl Boyer, has claimed that a deed from Edfu contained a "zero concept" replacing the magnitude in geometry. Friedhelm Hoffmann however clarifies that in the Egyptian method of calculating area it was only in this later, Ptolemaic era document that it contained an explicit placeholder for no length on one side. He emphasizes that it was not merely the negation particle jw "𓂜" but jwty, meaning "missing":

D35 G43

== Fractions ==
Rational numbers could also be expressed, but only as sums of unit fractions, i.e., sums of reciprocals of positive integers, except for 2/3 and 3/4. The hieroglyph indicating a fraction looked like a mouth, which meant "part":

D21

Fractions were written with this fractional solidus, i.e., the numerator 1, and the positive denominator below. Thus, 1/3 was written as:

D21 Z1 Z1 Z1	$= \frac{1}{3}$

Special symbols were used for 1/2 and for the non-unit fractions 2/3 and, less frequently, 3/4:

Aa16	$= \frac{1}{2}$	D22	$= \frac{2}{3}$	D23	$= \frac{3}{4}$

If the denominator became too large, the "mouth" was just placed over the beginning of the "denominator":

D21 V1	$= \frac{1}{100}$

== Written numbers ==
As with most modern day languages, the ancient Egyptian language could also write out numerals as words phonetically, just like one can write thirty instead of "30" in English. The word (thirty), for instance, was written as

while the numeral (30) was

V20 V20 V20

This was, however, uncommon for most numbers other than one and the signs were used most of the time.

== Hieratic numerals ==
As administrative and accounting texts were written on papyrus or ostraca, rather than being carved into hard stone (as were hieroglyphic texts), the vast majority of texts employing the Egyptian numeral system utilize the hieratic script. Instances of numerals written in hieratic can be found as far back as the Early Dynastic Period. The Old Kingdom Abusir Papyri are a particularly important corpus of texts that utilize hieratic numerals.

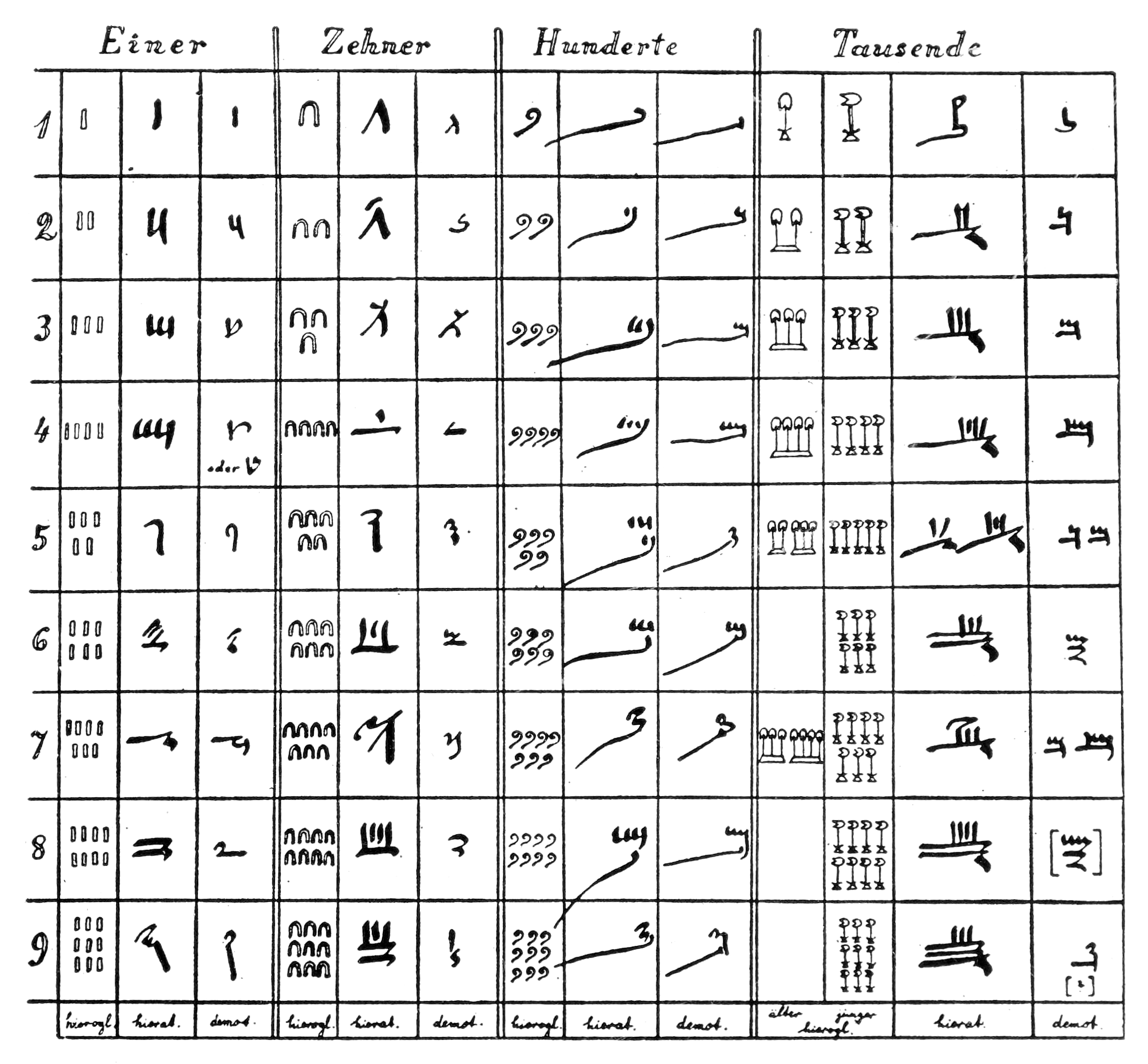
A comparative chart of Egyptian numerals, including hieratic and demotic

Boyer proved 50 years ago that hieratic script used a different numeral system, using individual signs for the numbers 1 to 9, multiples of 10 from 10 to 90, the hundreds from 100 to 900, and the thousands from 1000 to 9000. A large number like 9999 could thus be written with only four signs—combining the signs for 9000, 900, 90, and 9—as opposed to 36 hieroglyphs. Boyer saw the new hieratic numerals as ciphered, mapping one number onto one Egyptian letter for the first time in human history. Greeks adopted the new system, mapping their counting numbers onto two of their alphabets, the Doric and Ionian.

In the oldest hieratic texts the individual numerals were clearly written in a ciphered relationship to the Egyptian alphabet. But during the Old Kingdom a series of standardized writings had developed for sign-groups containing more than one numeral, repeated as Roman numerals practiced. However, repetition of the same numeral for each place-value was not allowed in the hieratic script. As the hieratic writing system developed over time, these sign-groups were further simplified for quick writing; this process continued into Demotic, as well.

Two famous mathematical papyri using hieratic script are the Moscow Mathematical Papyrus and the Rhind Mathematical Papyrus.

== Egyptian words for numbers ==
The following table shows the reconstructed Middle Egyptian forms of the numerals (which are indicated by a preceding asterisk), the transliteration of the hieroglyphs used to write them, and finally the Coptic numerals which descended from them and which give Egyptologists clues as to the vocalism of the original Egyptian numbers. A breve (˘) in some reconstructed forms indicates a short vowel whose quality remains uncertain; the letter 'e' represents a vowel that was originally u or i (exact quality uncertain) but became e by Late Egyptian.

Egyptian transliteration	Reconstructed vocalization		English translation	Coptic (Sahidic dialect)
Egyptian transliteration	per Callender 1975	per Loprieno 1995	English translation	Coptic (Sahidic dialect)
wꜥ(w) (masc.) wꜥt (fem.)	*wíꜥyaw (masc.) *wiꜥī́yat (fem.)	*wúꜥꜥuw (masc.)	one	ⲟⲩⲁ (oua) (masc.) ⲟⲩⲉⲓ (ouei) (fem.)
snwj (masc.) sntj (fem.)	*sínwaj (masc.) *síntaj (fem.)	*sinúwwaj (masc.)	two	ⲥⲛⲁⲩ (snau) (masc.) ⲥⲛ̄ⲧⲉ (snte) (fem.)
ḫmtw (masc.) ḫmtt (fem.)	*ḫámtaw (masc.) *ḫámtat (fem.)	*ḫámtaw (masc.)	three	ϣⲟⲙⲛ̄ⲧ (šomnt) (masc.) ϣⲟⲙⲧⲉ (šomte) (fem.)
jfdw (masc.) jfdt (fem.)	*j˘fdáw (masc.) *j˘fdát (fem.)	*jifdáw (masc.)	four	ϥⲧⲟⲟⲩ (ftoou) (masc.) ϥⲧⲟ (fto) or ϥⲧⲟⲉ (ftoe) (fem.)
djw (masc.) djt (fem.)	*dī́jaw (masc.) *dī́jat (fem.)	*dī́jaw (masc.)	five	ϯⲟⲩ (tiou) (masc.) ϯ (ti) or ϯⲉ (tie) (fem.)
sjsw or jsw (?) (masc.) sjst or jst (?) (fem.)	*j˘ssáw (masc.) *j˘ssát (fem.)	*sáʾsaw (masc.)	six	ⲥⲟⲟⲩ (soou) (masc.) ⲥⲟ (so) or ⲥⲟⲉ (soe) (fem.)
sfḫw (masc.) sfḫt (fem.)	*sáfḫaw (masc.) *sáfḫat (fem.)	*sáfḫaw (masc.)	seven	ϣⲁϣϥ̄ (šašf) (masc.) ϣⲁϣϥⲉ (šašfe) (fem.)
ḫmnw (masc.) ḫmnt (fem.)	*ḫ˘mā́naw (masc.) *ḫ˘mā́nat (fem.)	*ḫamā́naw (masc.)	eight	ϣⲙⲟⲩⲛ (šmoun) (masc.) ϣⲙⲟⲩⲛⲉ (šmoune) (fem.)
psḏw (masc.) psḏt (fem.)	*p˘sī́ḏaw (masc.) *p˘sī́ḏat (fem.)	*pisī́ḏaw (masc.)	nine	ⲯⲓⲥ (psis) (masc.) ⲯⲓⲧⲉ (psite) (fem.)
mḏw (masc.) mḏt (fem.)	*mū́ḏaw (masc.) *mū́ḏat (fem.)	*mū́ḏaw (masc.)	ten	ⲙⲏⲧ (mēt) (masc.) ⲙⲏⲧⲉ (mēte) (fem.)
mḏwtj, ḏwtj, or ḏbꜥty (?) (masc.) mḏwtt, ḏwtt, or ḏbꜥtt (?) (fem.)	*ḏubā́ꜥataj (masc.)	*(mu)ḏawā́taj (masc.)	twenty	ϫⲟⲩⲱⲧ (jouōt) (masc.) ϫⲟⲩⲱⲧⲉ (jouōte) (fem.)
mꜥbꜣ (masc.) mꜥbꜣt (fem.)	*máꜥb˘ꜣ (masc.)	*máꜥb˘ꜣ (masc.)	thirty	ⲙⲁⲁⲃ (maab) (masc.) ⲙⲁⲁⲃⲉ (maabe) (fem.)
ḥmw	*ḥ˘mí (?)	*ḥ˘méw	forty	ϩⲙⲉ (hme)
dyw	*díjwu	*díjjaw	fifty	ⲧⲁⲉⲓⲟⲩ (taeiou)
sjsjw, sjsw, or jswjw (?)	*j˘ssáwju	*saʾséw	sixty	ⲥⲉ (se)
sfḫjw, sfḫw, or sfḫwjw (?)	*safḫáwju	*safḫéw	seventy	ϣϥⲉ (šfe)
ḫmnjw, ḫmnw, or ḫmnwjw (?)	*ḫamanáwju	*ḫamnéw	eighty	ϩⲙⲉⲛⲉ (hmene)
psḏjw or psḏwjw (?)	*p˘siḏáwju	*pisḏíjjaw	ninety	ⲡⲥⲧⲁⲓⲟⲩ (pstaiou)
št	*šúwat	*ší(nju)t	one hundred	ϣⲉ (še)
štj	*šū́taj	*šinjū́taj	two hundred	ϣⲏⲧ (šēt)
ḫꜣ	*ḫaꜣ	*ḫaꜣ	one thousand	ϣⲟ (šo)
ḏbꜥ	*ḏubáꜥ	*ḏ˘báꜥ	ten thousand	ⲧⲃⲁ (tba)
ḥfn			one hundred thousand	
ḥḥ	*ḥaḥ	*ḥaḥ	one million	ϩⲁϩ (hah) "many"

== See also ==
- Egyptian language
- Egyptian mathematics

== Bibliography ==
- Allen, James Paul (2000). Middle Egyptian: An Introduction to the Language and Culture of Hieroglyphs. Cambridge: Cambridge University Press. Numerals discussed in §§9.1–9.6.
- Allen, James P. (2014). Middle Egyptian: An Introduction to the Language and Culture of Hieroglyphs (Third ed.). Cambridge University Press. ISBN 978-1-107-66328-2.
- Gardiner, Alan Henderson (1957). Egyptian Grammar; Being an Introduction to the Study of Hieroglyphs. 3rd ed. Oxford: Griffith Institute. For numerals, see §§259–266.
- Goedicke, Hans (1988). Old Hieratic Paleography. Baltimore: Halgo, Inc.
- Hoffmann, Friedhelm (2024-03-11). "Aspects of Zero in Ancient Egypt". In Gobets, Peter; Lawrence Kuhn, Robert (eds.). The Origin and Significance of Zero: An Interdisciplinary Perspective. Brill. pp. 64–81. doi:10.1163/9789004691568_007. ISBN 978-90-04-69156-8.
- Joseph, G.G. (2011). The Crest of the Peacock: Non-European Roots of Mathematics (Third ed.). Princeton University Press. ISBN 978-0-691-13526-7.
- Möller, Georg (1927). Hieratische Paläographie: Die Ägyptische Buchschrift in ihrer Entwicklung von der Fünften Dynastie bis zur römischen Kaiserzeit. 3 vols. 2nd ed. Leipzig: J. C. Hinrichs Schen Buchhandlungen. (Reprinted Osnabrück: Otto Zeller Verlag, 1965)
