= Cursive hieroglyphs =

Handwritten Egyptian hieroglyphs

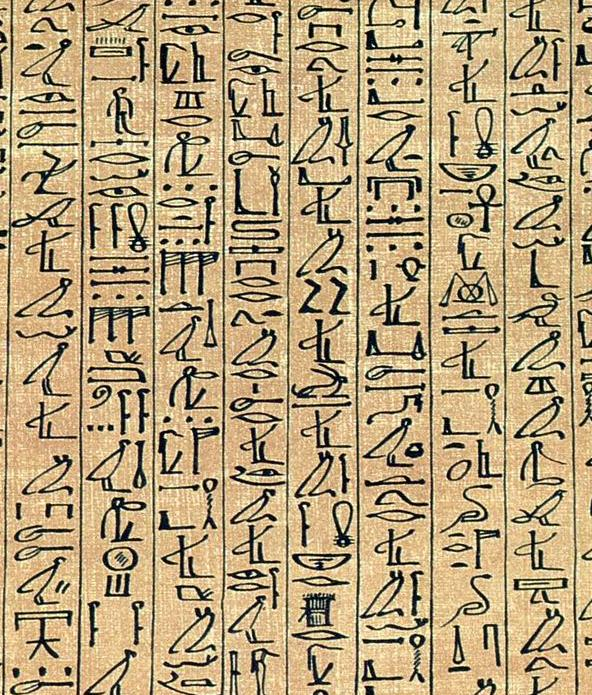
A section of the Papyrus of Ani showing cursive hieroglyphs.

Cursive hieroglyphs, or hieroglyphic book hand, was a form of Egyptian hieroglyphs commonly used for handwritten religious documents, such as the Book of the Dead. This style of writing was typically written with ink and a reed brush on papyrus, wood, or leather. It was particularly commonly used during the Ramesside Period, and for many famous documents, such as the Papyrus of Ani. It was also employed on wood for religious literature such as the Coffin Texts.

Cursive hieroglyphs should not be confused with the truly cursive form of hieroglyphs known as hieratic. Hieratic has many ligatures and signs unique to itself. However, there is a certain degree of influence from hieratic in the visual appearance of some signs. One significant difference is that the orientation of cursive hieroglyphs was not constant, writing right to left or left to right depending on the context, whereas hieratic was always written right to left. A right-to-left writing direction was also most common in the writing of cursive hieroglyphs, but they were usually arranged in columns rather than rows. The differences between cursive hieroglyphs and hieratic only became apparent after the end of the Old Kingdom, beginning with the First Intermediate Period. From this point, cursive hieroglyphs were mainly only used in sacralised contexts.

== See also ==
- Hieroglyphs
- Hieratic
- Demotic
