= The Independent (India) =

The Independent was an Allahabad based newspaper begun by Motilal Nehru in 1919. The paper closed down under British repression two years later.

The Independent was started on 5 February 1919 with the primary aim of countering the moderate political line adopted by the then leading Allahabad daily The Leader. Motilal Nehru was assisted in the paper's establishment by B G Horniman and Syud Hossain who became the Independent's editor. The paper's purpose according to Motilal was 'to wage war against autocracy' and to 'think aloud for India', but from the very beginning the paper suffered from weak finances. The newspaper was noted for its radical line and trenchant criticism of the British policies.

Syud Hossain resigned his editorship a few months later, after a discord with the Nehrus over his love affair with Vijayalakshmi Pandit, and left the country and George Joseph was appointed as his successor. With Joseph were three others on the editorial staff- Venkatraman, a lawyer, Sadanand who later became the manager of the Free Press group of newspapers and Mahadev Desai, Gandhi's associate and personal secretary. The strident critique of its policies was resented by the colonial government. In 1921 the Chief Secretary of the United Provinces wrote to George and the Independent's publisher C B Ranga Iyer accusing them of inciting violence through their publication and further asking them to refrain from publishing any such material in the future. The editor and the paper however chose to ignore the government's warning.

On 6 December 1921, George Joseph was arrested and in a trial held the next day sentenced to three years in prison. The government also confiscated the paper's security deposit. On 22 December 1921, Mahadev Desai started publishing the paper again under the caption 'I change, but I cannot die'. These were cyclostyled copies of a handwritten paper and each copy of it was auctioned, fetching a total sum of ₹350. Soon, Desai too was arrested and sentenced to a year's rigorous imprisonment for bringing out an unregistered newspaper. Following his arrest, Devdas Gandhi took over the newspaper.
