= George Gheverghese Joseph =

Mathematician and specialist in the history of mathematics

- Born: Kerala, India
- Occupation: Mathematician
- Relatives: George Joseph (grandfather); Pothan Joseph (great-uncle)

George Gheverghese Joseph, also known as G. G. Joseph is an Indian-born African mathematician who is a specialist in the history of mathematics. His works are mainly focused on the achievements of Kerala school of astronomy and mathematics and the transmission of mathematics from India to Europe.

== Early life and works ==
Joseph was born in Kerala, India. At the age of 9, his family moved to Mombasa, Kenya and he pursued his schooling in Kenya. He completed his degree in mathematics at the University of Leicester. After completing his degree, he worked as a school teacher for six years in Kenya and, then he did a master's degree and PhD at the University of Manchester, England.

He studied and conducted researches in applied mathematics and statistics, including multivariate analysis, mathematical programming, and demography. Through his research and the best selling book The Crest of the Peacock, he argued that the infinite series was invented by Kerala mathematicians in 1350, before Europeans. This work garnered publicity and generated discussions in the history of maths on the discoveries made by Indians that predated the Europeans. He is considered by many to be an early pioneer in the decolonising the curriculum movement.

He qualified in Law in 2000. In 2003, he published a biography of his grandfather, also called George Joseph who was instrumental in India's battle for independence. In 2025, he published a memoir on his experiences growing up in India and Kenya and then studying in England in the 1950s.

== Bibliography ==
- The Crest of the Peacock: Non-European Roots of Mathematics, Princeton University Press, 1991.
- A Passage to Infinity: Medieval Indian Mathematics from Kerala and its Impact, 2009.
- Between Empires: A Life Across Borders and Boundaries, 2025
- Kerala Mathematics: History and Its Possible Transmission to Europe, 2009.
- George Joseph: The Life and Times of a Kerala Christian Nationalist, 2003
- Indian Mathematics: Engaging with the World from Ancient to Modern Times, 2016
- Multicultural Mathematics: Teaching Mathematics from a Global Perspective (with David Nelson and Julian Williams), 1993.
- Women at Work: The British Experience, 1983.
