= George Joseph (activist) =

Indian politician (1887–1938)

- Born: 5 June 1887; Chengannur, Travancore
- Died: 5 March 1938 (aged 50); Madurai, Madras Presidency, British India
- Occupations: Indian independence activist lawyer
- Political party: Indian National Congress
- Other political affiliations: Justice Party
- Relatives: Pothan Joseph (brother); George Gheverghese Joseph (grandson)

George Joseph (5 June 1887 – 5 March 1938) was a lawyer and Indian independence activist. One of the earliest and among the most prominent Syrian Christians from Kerala to join the freedom struggle, George's working life in Madurai and is remembered for his role in the Home Rule agitation and the Vaikom Satyagraha and for his editorship of Motilal Nehru's The Independent and Mahatma Gandhi's Young India.

== Early life and education ==
George Joseph was born the eldest child of C. I. Joseph of the Oorayil House at Chengannur, a town in the Travancore State and now a part of the Indian state of Kerala. His younger brother, Pothan Joseph, became a famous journalist and editor of several newspapers. George studied at the Madras Christian College and did M.A. in philosophy at the University of Edinburgh before doing law at the Middle Temple, London in 1908. During his time in London he came into contact with many prominent Indian freedom fighters there. Having completed his studies, he returned to India in January 1909.

== Role in the freedom struggle ==
On George's return from London, he initially set up practice at Madras before shifting to Madurai. He hosted at his house in Madurai several leaders of the freedom struggle including Gandhi, C. Rajagopalachari, Srinivasa Iyengar and K. Kamaraj during their visits there. Subramania Bharati composed the Viduthalai, a well known patriotic song while staying at George's residence.

=== Home Rule and Non Cooperation Movements ===
In 1917, aged 29, George was invited by Annie Besant to go to England along with her, Syed Hussain and BV Narasimhan to talk about Home Rule there. The British however foiled this bid, arresting them when the ship Besant had chartered reached Gibraltar, Subsequently, deporting them back to India. When P. Varadarajulu Naidu was arrested for making a speech at the Victoria Edward Hall, George Joseph assisted C. Rajagopalachari who appeared for Naidu in the case. George was the leader of the Rowlatt Satyagraha in Madurai, organising meetings, fasts and hartals during the satyagraha and during the Non-Cooperation Movement he relinquished his lucrative legal practice and joined the movement.

=== Trade unionist and editor ===
George played an important role in setting up the trade union movement in Madurai to organise the textile mill workers there. The union's initial struggles resulted in higher wages and reduced work hours for the mill workers but soon the mill owners and the government came together to bring about a collapse of the union. George edited the Nehrus' Allahabad based newspaper The Independent during 1920-21 until his arrest on charges of sedition and the subsequent closure of the paper. He also succeeded Rajagopalachari to the editorship of Gandhi's Young India in 1923.

=== Vaikom Satyagraha ===
George was an eager participant in the Vaikom Satyagraha that sought to achieve the right to temple entry for the Dalits in Travancore. According to C. F. Andrews, the plan for a non violent agitation was arrived upon by George when he visited Gandhi who was convalescing in Bombay. George and other Congressmen led the Dalits in walking through the Brahmin quarter of the town where they were met with violence. The police immediately arrested George and his accomplices who were sentenced to varying terms in prison. George viewed the struggle at Vaikom an issue of civil rights for all Indian citizens but this was in contrast to the views of most Congressmen who saw it as purely an issue between high and low caste Hindus and to be settled by the Hindus themselves. Gandhi himself did not encourage George's participation in the satyagraha. Disillusioned by Gandhi's lack of support and the attitude of the Congress Party, George left the Congress Party to join the Justice Party. He however rejoined the Congress in 1935.

=== Rosapoo Durai ===
George led Congressmen of Madurai in the agitation against the Simon Commission. In this he was supported by K Kamaraj and the duo mobilised thousands of volunteers at the Tirumalai Nayak Mahal to demonstrate against the Commission when it visited Madurai in 1929. Later, when Kamaraj was implicated in Virudhunagar Conspiracy Case in 1933, George and Varadarajulu Naidu argued on his behalf and succeeded in exonerating him of all charges. He also agitated against the Criminal Tribes Act (CTA), an act that criminalised and negatively affected communities like the Piramalai kallar and Maravars. He fought for them in the courts and wrote extensively in the newspapers against the act and came to be called Rosapoo Durai by the grateful Kallars who continue to pay homage to him on his death anniversary.

== Parliamentary career ==
In 1929 George contested the municipal elections in Madurai on a Congress ticket but lost. In July 1937, he was elected to the Central Legislative Assembly from Madura-cum-Ramnad-Tirunelveli constituency.

== Death and commemoration ==
Following a prolonged period of illness, George died at the American Mission Hospital in Madurai on 5 March 1938. He was 50. He is buried at the East Gate Cemetery in Madurai. George Joseph: The Life and Times of a Christian Nationalist is his biography by his grandson George Gheverghese Joseph.

== Other sources ==
- Joseph, George Gheverghese (2003). On life and times of George Joseph, 1887–1938, a Syrian Christian nationalist from Kerala. Orient Longman. p. 18. ISBN 978-81-250-2495-8.
