= A Passage to Infinity =

Social origins of the Kerala School

A Passage to Infinity: Medieval Indian Mathematics from Kerala and Its Impact
- Author: George Gheverghese Joseph
- Language: English
- Subject: History of mathematics
- Publisher: SAGE India
- Publication date: November 2009
- Pages: 323
- ISBN: 978-8132101680

A Passage to Infinity: Medieval Indian Mathematics from Kerala and Its Impact is a 2009 book by George Gheverghese Joseph chronicling the social and mathematical origins of the Kerala school of astronomy and mathematics. The book discusses the highlights of the achievements of Kerala school and also analyses the hypotheses and conjectures on the possible transmission of Kerala mathematics to Europe.

== An outline of the contents ==
1. Introduction
2. The Social Origins of the Kerala School
3. The Mathematical Origins of the Kerala School
4. The Highlights of Kerala Mathematics and Astronomy
5. Indian Trigonometry: From Ancient Beginnings to Nilakantha
6. Squaring the Circle: The Kerala Answer
7. Reaching for the Stars: The Power Series for Sines and Cosines
8. Changing Perspectives on Indian Mathematics
9. Exploring Transmissions: A Case Study of Kerala Mathematics
10. A Final Assessment

== See also ==
- Indian astronomy
- Indian mathematics
- History of mathematics

== Further references ==
- In association with the Royal Society's 350th anniversary celebrations in 2010, Asia House presented a talk based on A Passage to Infinity. See : "A Passage to Infinity: Indian Mathematics in World Mathematics".
- For an audio-visual presentation of George Gheverghese Joseph's views on the ideas presented in the book, see : Joseph, George Gheverghese (16 September 2008). "George Gheverghese Joseph on the Transmission to Europe of Non-European Mathematics". The Mathematical Association of America. Archived from the original on 15 April 2010.
- The Economic Times talks to George Gheverghese Joseph on The Passage to Infinity. See : Lal, Amrith (23 April 2010). "Indian mathematics loved numbers". The Economic Times.
- Review of "A PASSAGE TO INFINITY: Medieval Indian Mathematics from Kerala and its impact" by M. Ram Murty in Hardy-Ramanujan Journal, 36 (2013), 43–46.
- Nair, R. Madhavan (3 February 2011). "In search of the roots of mathematics". The Hindu.
