= Pothan Joseph =

Indian journalist (1892–1972)

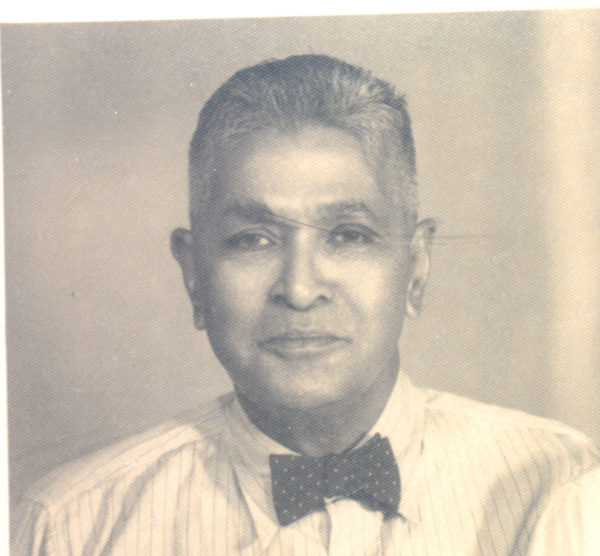
- Born: 1892; Chengannur, Travancore, British India (Present day Kerala)
- Died: 2 November 1972 (aged 79–80)
- Occupation: Journalist
- Relatives: George Joseph (brother)
- Awards: Padma Bhushan (1973)

Pothan Joseph (1892–1972) was a journalist in 20th-century India whose career spanned the twenty years before and twenty years after India's independence. He worked with notable people of the time such as Muhammad Ali Jinnah, Annie Besant, Mahatma Gandhi, Sarojini Naidu, and Motilal Nehru. He was the first to write a daily political column for five decades, called 'Over A Cup of Tea', sprinkled with Biblical and Dickensian quotes. He also discovered and nurtured the Indian cartoonist Shankar, helping to make political cartoons a staple of newspapers.

Pothan started or developed 26 newspapers. These included the Hindustan Times, the Indian Express, and the Deccan Herald. He was the first editor of Dawn in 1942 while it was based in New Delhi. He left Dawn to take a position with the government.

Pothan Joseph guarded editorial freedom and demanded that editors support those who worked in the editorial wing and never encroach on their freedom. Even before unionization, Pothan also pleaded for proper payment to deserving journalists. His motto during his working life was "courage, vigilance and fidelity".

== Early life and education ==
Pothan Joseph was born on 13 March 1892, to C. I. Joseph of Oorayil House, Chengannur, Kerala, India. His older brother George was a lawyer and an Indian independence activist. He graduated with a degree in Physics from Presidency College in Madras (Chennai), and then took his LL.B. degree in law from the University of Bombay. He quickly abandoned ideas of a legal career, became a writer for the Hyderabad Bulletin and finally found his calling when he joined The Bombay Chronicle in 1918, then edited by B.G. Horniman.

== Career ==
He participated in India's struggle for independence, working alongside leaders such as Mahatma Gandhi, Motilal Nehru, Annie Besant, Muhammad Ali Jinnah, and Sarojini Naidu. A prolific journalist, he became widely known for his long-running political column, Over a Cup of Tea, which appeared—sometimes with interruptions—for nearly four decades in newspapers including the Hindustan Times, The Indian Express, and Deccan Herald. Journalist and author T. J. S. George, who authored his biography Lessons in Journalism: The Story of Pothan Joseph, described the column as "a heady brew, loved and respected, occasionally imitated but never equalled." Its readership spanned both the "ruling class" and the common people.

Throughout his career, he held numerous editorial positions in a wide array of publications. He worked for the nationalist newspaper the Indian National Herald, as well as The Bombay Chronicle, Hyderabad Bulletin, Capital, Indian Daily Telegraph, Indian Daily Mail, Star of India, and Voice of India. During his period in Hindustan Times, he brought K. Shankar Pillai to Delhi as a staff cartoonist.

In 1942, he became the first editor of Dawn, founded by Jinnah and then based in New Delhi. His daughter, Anna Varki, later wrote in her memoir One Woman's India that "My father was not for Partition of the country, but he believed there was a case for the Muslims." His decision to join Dawn surprised Gandhi, who wrote to him: "My dear Pothan, why have you left us? I am a poor man. I need to read what you write, so don't fail to send me a copy of Dawn." Dawn was the only newspaper to report Kasturba Gandhi's death early the next morning, along with an obituary by Joseph.

Joseph also briefly served as the first Principal Information Officer of the Great Indian Peninsula Railway and entered public life as an elected member of the Bombay Municipal Corporation. His most substantial editorial tenure was at the Deccan Herald. When the newspaper was launched in June 1948, he became its founding editor, contributing the inaugural editorial. He remained with the paper for nearly a decade, the longest period he spent in any single newspaper. In 1956, while serving as Editor of Deccan Herald, he led the Indian delegation to the inaugural World Congress of Journalists. He left the newspaper two years later.

Joseph's style of writing was characterized with wit. In the later years of his career, he edited Swarajya for a short period before retiring. He spent his final years in a quiet and modest life among family and friends, until his death on 2 November 1972 at age 80. Upon his death, the then Prime Minister Indira Gandhi praised his service to journalism and recording history. Deccan Chronicle wrote that "the thought that our teacher is no more reduces us almost to tears."

== Honors ==
Pothan served as the president of the Indian Federation of Working Journalists for numerous years. As a rule he shunned formal accolades, saying, "what is the use of moss to a rolling stone?" He was posthumously awarded the Padma Bhushan, one of India's highest civilian honors, in 1973.
