= Hieratic =

Cursive writing system used in ancient Egyptian

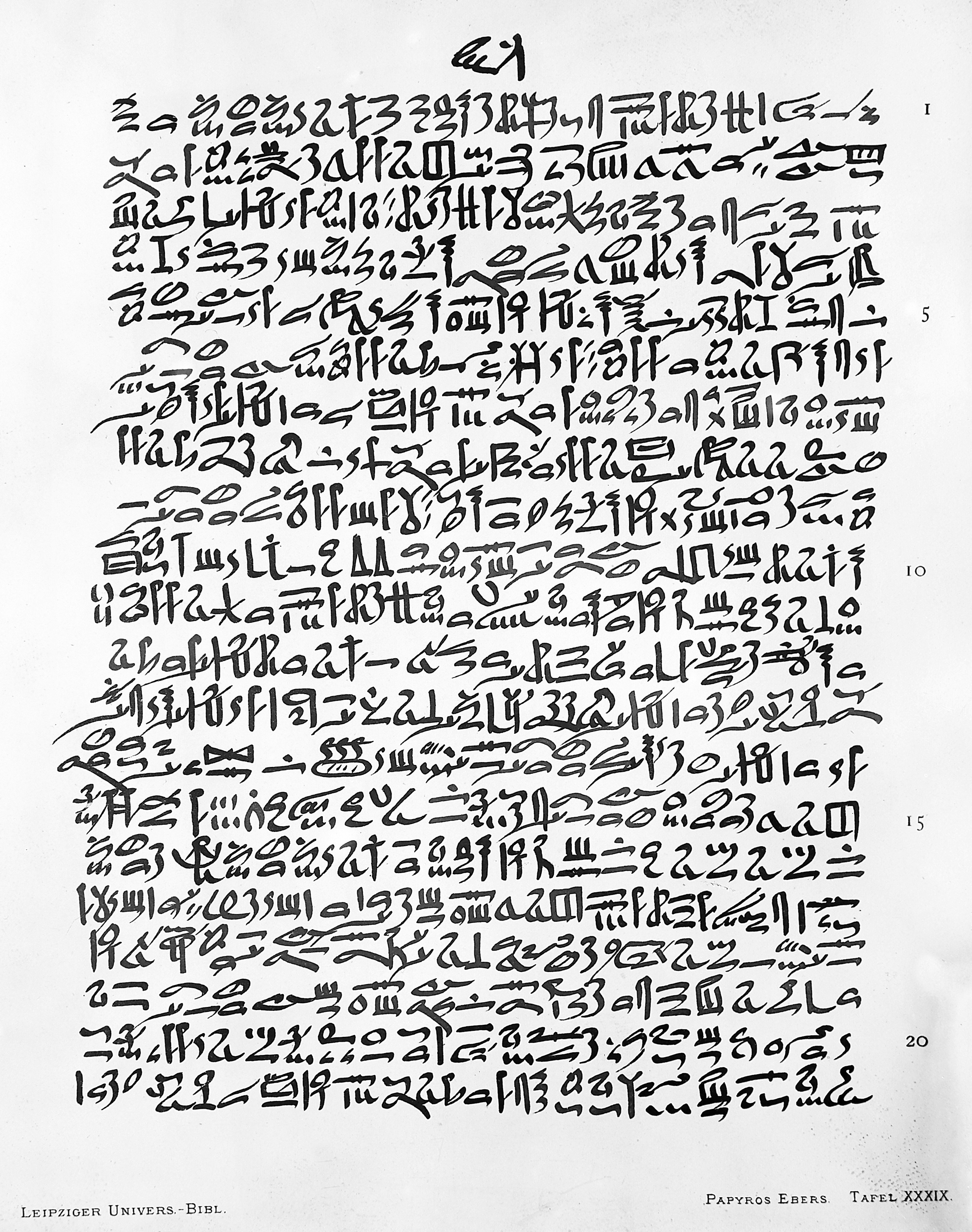
- Transcribed papyrus, c. 1500 BCE
- Script type: Logographic with consonants
- Period: c. 3200 BCE – 3rd century CE
- Direction: Mixed
- Languages: Egyptian language

Related scripts
- Parent systems: Egyptian hieroglyphs: Hieratic
- Child systems: Demotic possibly inspired Byblos syllabary

ISO 15924
- ISO 15924: Egyh (060), Egyptian hieratic

Unicode
- Unicode range: U+13000–U+1342F (unified with Egyptian hieroglyphs)

Hieratic (/haɪəˈrætɪk/; Ancient Greek: ἱερατικά, romanized: hieratiká, lit. 'priestly') was the simplified cursive writing system used in Ancient Egypt and the principal script used to write the ancient Egyptian language from the 3rd millennium BCE until the rise of Demotic script in the mid-1st millennium BCE. It was primarily written in ink with a reed brush on papyrus.

Hieratic should not be confused with cursive hieroglyphs. The two were indistinct during the Old Kingdom but separated into different writing systems during the First Intermediate Period.

== Etymology ==
In the 2nd century CE, the Greek scholar Clement of Alexandria used the term hieratic for the first time to describe the ancient Egyptian writing system. The term derives from the Greek for 'priestly writing' (Koine Greek: γράμματα ἱερατικά) because at that time, for more than 850 years, hieratic had been used traditionally only for religious texts and literature.

Hieratic can also be an adjective, meaning 'of or associated with sacred persons or offices; sacerdotal'.

== Development ==
Hieratic developed as a cursive form of hieroglyphic script in the Naqada III period of Ancient Egypt, roughly 3200–3000 BCE. Although handwritten printed hieroglyphs continued to be used in some formal situations, such as manuscripts of the Egyptian Book of the Dead, noncursive hieroglyphic script became largely restricted to monumental inscriptions.

Around 650 BCE, the more cursive Demotic script developed from hieratic. Demotic arose in northern Egypt and replaced hieratic and the southern shorthand known as abnormal hieratic (more at § Characteristics) for most mundane writing, such as personal letters and mercantile documents. Hieratic continued to be used by the priestly class for religious texts and literature into the 3rd century CE.

== Uses and materials ==
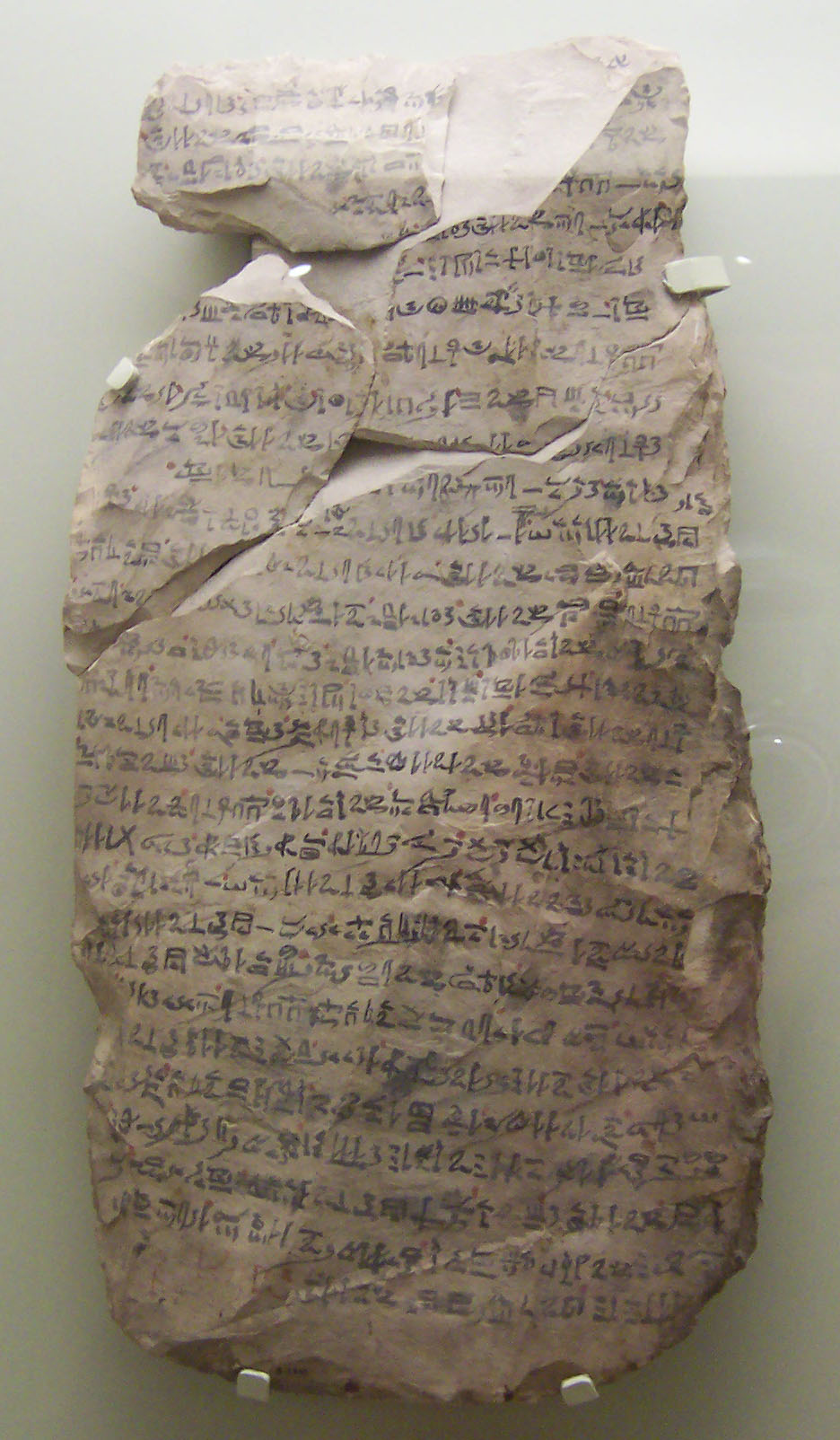
One of four official letters to vizier Khay copied onto fragments of limestone, an ostracon, held at the Royal Ontario Museum

Through most of its long history, hieratic was used for writing administrative documents, accounts, legal texts, and letters, as well as mathematical, medical, literary, and religious texts. During the Greco-Roman period, when Demotic, and later, Greek, had become the chief administrative script, hieratic was limited primarily to religious texts. In general, hieratic was much more important than hieroglyphs throughout Egypt's history, being the script used in daily life. It was also the writing system first taught to students, knowledge of hieroglyphs being limited to a small minority who were given additional training. It is often possible to detect errors in hieroglyphic texts that came about due to a misunderstanding of an original hieratic text.

Most often, hieratic script was written in ink with a reed brush on papyrus, wood, stone, or pottery ostraca. During the Roman period, reed pens (calami) were also used. Thousands of limestone ostraca have been found at the site of Deir al-Madinah, revealing an intimate picture of the lives of common Egyptian workers. Besides papyrus, stone, ceramic shards, and wood, there are hieratic texts on leather rolls, although few have survived. There are also hieratic texts written on cloth, especially on linen used in mummification. There are some hieratic texts inscribed on stone, a variety known as lapidary hieratic. These are particularly common on stelae from the twenty-second dynasty.

During the late sixth dynasty, hieratic was sometimes incised into mud tablets with a stylus, similar to cuneiform. About five hundred of these tablets have been discovered in the governor's palace at Ayn Asil (Balat), and a single example was discovered from the site of Ayn al-Gazzarin, both in the Dakhla Oasis. At the time the tablets were made, Dakhla was located far from centers of papyrus production. These tablets record inventories, name lists, accounts, and approximately fifty letters. Of the letters, many are internal letters that were circulated within the palace and the local settlement, but others were sent from other villages in the oasis to the governor.

== Characteristics ==
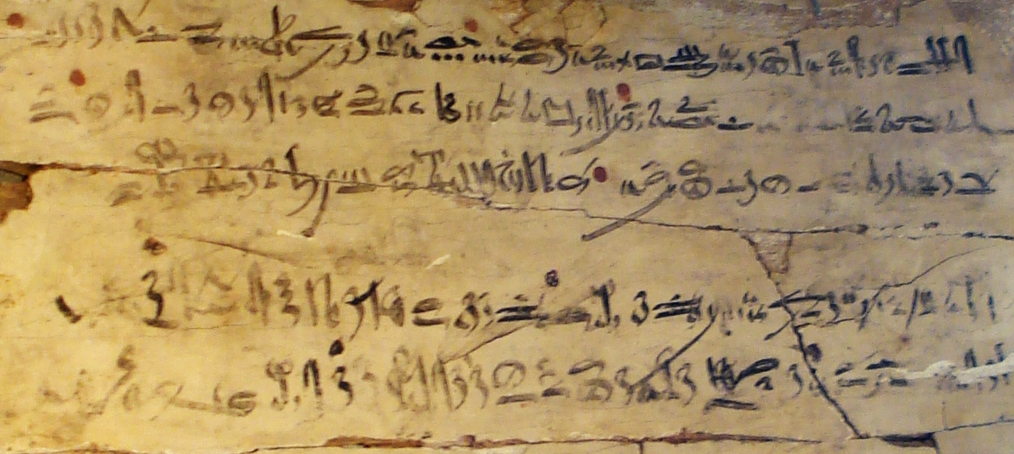
An exercise tablet with a hieratic excerpt from The Instructions of Amenemhat (dated to the eighteenth dynasty reign of Amenhotep I, c. 1514–1493 BCE) reads: "Be on your guard against all who are subordinate to you... Trust no brother, know no friend, make no intimates."

Hieratic script, unlike inscriptional and manuscript hieroglyphs, reads from right to left. Initially, hieratic could be written in either columns or horizontal lines, but after the twelfth dynasty (specifically during the reign of Amenemhat III), horizontal writing became the standard.

Hieratic is noted for its cursive nature and use of ligatures for a number of characters. Hieratic script also uses a much more standardized orthography than hieroglyphs; texts written in the latter often had to take into account extra-textual concerns, such as decorative uses and religious concerns that were not present in, say, a tax receipt. There are also some signs that are unique to hieratic, although Egyptologists have invented equivalent hieroglyphic forms for hieroglyphic transcriptions and typesetting. Several hieratic characters have diacritical additions so that similar signs could easily be distinguished.

Hieratic is often present in any given period in two forms, a highly ligatured, cursive script used for administrative documents, and a broad uncial bookhand used for literary, scientific, and religious texts. These two forms can often be significantly different from one another. Letters, in particular, used very cursive forms for quick writing, often with large numbers of abbreviations for formulaic phrases, similar to shorthand.

A highly cursive form of hieratic known as "Abnormal Hieratic" was used in the Theban area from the second half of the twentieth dynasty until the beginning of the twenty-sixth dynasty. It derives from the script of Upper Egyptian administrative documents and was used primarily for legal texts, land leases, letters, and other texts. This type of writing was superseded by Demotic—a Lower Egyptian scribal tradition—during the twenty-sixth dynasty, when Demotic was established as a standard administrative script throughout a re-unified Egypt.

== Influence ==
Hieratic has had influence on a number of other writing systems. The most obvious is that on Demotic, its direct descendant. Related to this are the Demotic signs of the Meroitic script and the borrowed Demotic characters used in the Coptic alphabet and Old Nubian.

Outside of the Nile Valley, many of the signs used in the Byblos syllabary apparently were borrowed from Old Kingdom hieratic signs. It is also known that early Hebrew used hieratic numerals.

== Unicode ==
The Unicode standard considers hieratic characters to be font variants of the Egyptian hieroglyphs, and the two scripts have been unified. Hieroglyphs were added to the Unicode Standard in October 2009 with the release of version 5.2.

With regards the possibility of including a dedicated hieratic font, the Unicode Standard, Version 5.2 states:

In the years since Champollion published his decipherment of Egyptian in 1824, Egyptologists have shown little interest in typesetting hieratic text. Consequently, there is no tradition of hieratic fonts in either lead or digital formats. Because hieratic is a cursive form of the underlying hieroglyphic characters, hieratic text is normally rendered using the more easily legible hieroglyphs. In principle a hieratic font could be devised for specialist applications, but as for fonts for other cursive writing systems, it would require very large ligature tables—even larger than usual, because of the great many hieroglyphic signs involved.

Some work towards developing a dedicated hieratic font was made by Gosline (2002) and the Hieratic Font Project. Currently Egyptologists must first transcribe hieratic into hieroglyphs before typesetting and translating.

== See also ==
- Cuneiform
- Egyptian hieroglyphs
- Cursive hieroglyphs
- Demotic Egyptian script
- Georg Möller, an important scholar of hieratic paleography
- Cursive script (East Asia)
