= The Crest of the Peacock =

Book by George Gheverghese Joseph

The Crest of the Peacock: Non-European Roots of Mathematics
- Author: George Gheverghese Joseph
- Language: English
- Subject: History of mathematics
- Publisher: Princeton University Press
- Publication date: 1991
- Pages: 592
- ISBN: 9780691135267

The Crest of the Peacock: Non-European Roots of Mathematics is a book authored by George Gheverghese Joseph, and was first published by Princeton University Press in 1991. The book was brought out as a response to view of the history of mathematics epitomized by Morris Kline's statement that, comparing to what the Greeks achieved, "the mathematics of Egyptians and Babylonians is the scrawling of children just learning to write, as opposed to great literature", criticised by Joseph as "Eurocentric". The third edition of the book was released in 2011.

The book is divided into 11 chapters. Chapter 1 provides a lengthy justification for the book. Chapter 2 is devoted to a discussion of the mathematics of Native Americans and Chapter 3 to the mathematics of ancient Egyptians. The next two chapters consider the mathematics of Mesopotamia, then there are two chapters on Chinese mathematics, three chapters on Indian mathematics, and the final chapter discusses Islamic mathematics.

== Plagiarism ==
C. K. Raju accused Joseph and Dennis Almeida of plagiarism of his decade long scholastic work that began in 1998 for the Project of History of Indian Science, Philosophy and Culture funded by the Indian Academy of Sciences concerning Indian mathematics and its possible knowledge transfer. An ethics investigation of the research team of Joseph and Almeida led University of Exeter to issue Almeida a formal written warning. Later, the University of Manchester posted an erratum and acknowledgement of Raju's work.

Joseph denies the charges.

== Reviews ==
- A review of the first edition of the book: Victor J. Katz (August 1992). "Book Review: The crest of the peacock: Non-European roots of mathematics: By George Gheverghese Joseph" (PDF). Historia Mathematica. 19 (3): 310–315. doi:10.1016/0315-0860(92)90042-a.
- A review of the book by European Mathematical Information Service: Abdul Karim Bangura (Summer 2001). "Review of The Crest of the Peacock: Non-European Roots of Mathematics. 2nd. ed". Nexus Mathematical Journal. 3 (3).
- A review of the book by David Pingree: David Pingree (September 1993). "Reviewed Work: The Crest of the Peacock: Non-European Roots of Mathematics by George Gheverghese Joseph". Isis. 84 (3): 548–549. doi:10.1086/356553. JSTOR 235648.
- For a critical assessment of some of the claims and arguments of the author: Clemency Montelle (December 2013). "Review of The crest of the peacock: Non-European roots of mathematics" (PDF). Notices of the AMS: 1459–1463.
