= Georg Möller =

German Egyptologist and university professor (1876–1921)

Georg Möller (1876–1921) was a German Egyptologist.

He was born in Venezuela as the son of a German businessman. His family moved to Hamburg when he was five. From 1896 he studied at Humboldt University under Adolf Erman. He received his doctoral degree in 1900. In the 1902/3 season he participated in the excavations of the pyramid of Nyuserre Ini under Ludwig Borchardt. He was employed in the German consulate in Cairo during 1904–1907. In the 1905/6 season, he excavated at Abu Sir al Malaq. In 1907/8 he worked at the Sahure temple, Abusir. In 1911/12 he excavated at Deir el-Medina. He returned to Berlin and worked as Privatdozent at Humboldt University from 1912, promoted to professor in 1916. In World War I he served in Asia Minor. He died in 1921 from Malaria he had contracted there.

His most notable contributions are in the field of hieratic writing and Egyptian paleography.

== Publications ==
- Ueber die in einem späthieratischen Papyrus des Berliner Museums erhaltenen Pyramidentexte. Paul, Berlin 1900 (= Dissertation).
- Hieratische Paläographie. Die aegyptische Buchschrift in ihrer Entwicklung von der fünften Dynastie bis zur römischen Kaiserzeit. 3 Bände. 1. Hinrichs, Leipzig 1909. 2. Auflage Hinrichs, Leipzig 1936, Bd. 4 Ergänzungsheft Hinrichs, Leipzig 1936 (Digitalisat).
  - Band 1
  - Band 2
  - Band 3
  - Ergänzungsheft.
- Hieratische Lesestücke für den akademischen Gebrauch. 3 Bände. Hinrichs, Leipzig 1910–1927.
- Die beiden Totenpapyrus Rhind des Museums zu Edinburgh. Hinrichs, Leipzig 1913 (Digitalisat).
- Demotische Texte aus den Königlichen Museen zu Berlin. Bd. 1: Mumienschilder. Hinrichs, Leipzig 1913.
- Ägyptische Mumienporträts (= Wasmuth's Kunsthefte 1). Wasmuth, Berlin 1919.
- Die Metallkunst der alten Ägypter. Wasmuth, Berlin 1924.
- Die archaeologischen Ergebnisse des vorgeschichtlichen Gräberfeldes von Abusir el-Meleq nach den Aufzeichnungen Georg Möllers. Bearbeitet von Alexander Scharff. Hinrichs, Leipzig 1926.
