= Egyptian Hieroglyphs =

Egyptian Hieroglyphs may refer to:

- Egyptian hieroglyphs, a formal alphabetic/logographic writing system of ancient Egypt
- Egyptian Hieroglyphs (Unicode block), a block of Unicode characters containing the characters of the Gardiner sign list
