= Egyptian Hieroglyphs Extended-A =

- Range: U+13460..U+143FF (4,000 code points)
- Plane: SMP
- Scripts: Egyptian Hieroglyphs
- Assigned: 3,995 code points
- Unused: 5 reserved code points

Unicode version history
- 16.0 (2024): 3,995 (+3,995)

Unicode documentation
- Code chart ∣ Web page

Egyptian Hieroglyphs Extended-A is a Unicode block containing additional Egyptian hieroglyphs including those used in Ptolemaic texts.

== Block ==
Egyptian Hieroglyphs Extended-A^{[1]}^{[2]} Official Unicode Consortium code chart (PDF)
	0	1	2	3	4	5	6	7	8	9	A	B	C	D	E	F
U+1346x	𓑠	𓑡	𓑢	𓑣	𓑤	𓑥	𓑦	𓑧	𓑨	𓑩	𓑪	𓑫	𓑬	𓑭	𓑮	𓑯
U+1347x	𓑰	𓑱	𓑲	𓑳	𓑴	𓑵	𓑶	𓑷	𓑸	𓑹	𓑺	𓑻	𓑼	𓑽	𓑾	𓑿
U+1348x	𓒀	𓒁	𓒂	𓒃	𓒄	𓒅	𓒆	𓒇	𓒈	𓒉	𓒊	𓒋	𓒌	𓒍	𓒎	𓒏
U+1349x	𓒐	𓒑	𓒒	𓒓	𓒔	𓒕	𓒖	𓒗	𓒘	𓒙	𓒚	𓒛	𓒜	𓒝	𓒞	𓒟
U+134Ax	𓒠	𓒡	𓒢	𓒣	𓒤	𓒥	𓒦	𓒧	𓒨	𓒩	𓒪	𓒫	𓒬	𓒭	𓒮	𓒯
U+134Bx	𓒰	𓒱	𓒲	𓒳	𓒴	𓒵	𓒶	𓒷	𓒸	𓒹	𓒺	𓒻	𓒼	𓒽	𓒾	𓒿
U+134Cx	𓓀	𓓁	𓓂	𓓃	𓓄	𓓅	𓓆	𓓇	𓓈	𓓉	𓓊	𓓋	𓓌	𓓍	𓓎	𓓏
U+134Dx	𓓐	𓓑	𓓒	𓓓	𓓔	𓓕	𓓖	𓓗	𓓘	𓓙	𓓚	𓓛	𓓜	𓓝	𓓞	𓓟
U+134Ex	𓓠	𓓡	𓓢	𓓣	𓓤	𓓥	𓓦	𓓧	𓓨	𓓩	𓓪	𓓫	𓓬	𓓭	𓓮	𓓯
U+134Fx	𓓰	𓓱	𓓲	𓓳	𓓴	𓓵	𓓶	𓓷	𓓸	𓓹	𓓺	𓓻	𓓼	𓓽	𓓾	𓓿
U+1350x	𓔀	𓔁	𓔂	𓔃	𓔄	𓔅	𓔆	𓔇	𓔈	𓔉	𓔊	𓔋	𓔌	𓔍	𓔎	𓔏
U+1351x	𓔐	𓔑	𓔒	𓔓	𓔔	𓔕	𓔖	𓔗	𓔘	𓔙	𓔚	𓔛	𓔜	𓔝	𓔞	𓔟
U+1352x	𓔠	𓔡	𓔢	𓔣	𓔤	𓔥	𓔦	𓔧	𓔨	𓔩	𓔪	𓔫	𓔬	𓔭	𓔮	𓔯
U+1353x	𓔰	𓔱	𓔲	𓔳	𓔴	𓔵	𓔶	𓔷	𓔸	𓔹	𓔺	𓔻	𓔼	𓔽	𓔾	𓔿
U+1354x	𓕀	𓕁	𓕂	𓕃	𓕄	𓕅	𓕆	𓕇	𓕈	𓕉	𓕊	𓕋	𓕌	𓕍	𓕎	𓕏
U+1355x	𓕐	𓕑	𓕒	𓕓	𓕔	𓕕	𓕖	𓕗	𓕘	𓕙	𓕚	𓕛	𓕜	𓕝	𓕞	𓕟
U+1356x	𓕠	𓕡	𓕢	𓕣	𓕤	𓕥	𓕦	𓕧	𓕨	𓕩	𓕪	𓕫	𓕬	𓕭	𓕮	𓕯
U+1357x	𓕰	𓕱	𓕲	𓕳	𓕴	𓕵	𓕶	𓕷	𓕸	𓕹	𓕺	𓕻	𓕼	𓕽	𓕾	𓕿
U+1358x	𓖀	𓖁	𓖂	𓖃	𓖄	𓖅	𓖆	𓖇	𓖈	𓖉	𓖊	𓖋	𓖌	𓖍	𓖎	𓖏
U+1359x	𓖐	𓖑	𓖒	𓖓	𓖔	𓖕	𓖖	𓖗	𓖘	𓖙	𓖚	𓖛	𓖜	𓖝	𓖞	𓖟
U+135Ax	𓖠	𓖡	𓖢	𓖣	𓖤	𓖥	𓖦	𓖧	𓖨	𓖩	𓖪	𓖫	𓖬	𓖭	𓖮	𓖯
U+135Bx	𓖰	𓖱	𓖲	𓖳	𓖴	𓖵	𓖶	𓖷	𓖸	𓖹	𓖺	𓖻	𓖼	𓖽	𓖾	𓖿
U+135Cx	𓗀	𓗁	𓗂	𓗃	𓗄	𓗅	𓗆	𓗇	𓗈	𓗉	𓗊	𓗋	𓗌	𓗍	𓗎	𓗏
U+135Dx	𓗐	𓗑	𓗒	𓗓	𓗔	𓗕	𓗖	𓗗	𓗘	𓗙	𓗚	𓗛	𓗜	𓗝	𓗞	𓗟
U+135Ex	𓗠	𓗡	𓗢	𓗣	𓗤	𓗥	𓗦	𓗧	𓗨	𓗩	𓗪	𓗫	𓗬	𓗭	𓗮	𓗯
U+135Fx	𓗰	𓗱	𓗲	𓗳	𓗴	𓗵	𓗶	𓗷	𓗸	𓗹	𓗺	𓗻	𓗼	𓗽	𓗾	𓗿
U+1360x	𓘀	𓘁	𓘂	𓘃	𓘄	𓘅	𓘆	𓘇	𓘈	𓘉	𓘊	𓘋	𓘌	𓘍	𓘎	𓘏
U+1361x	𓘐	𓘑	𓘒	𓘓	𓘔	𓘕	𓘖	𓘗	𓘘	𓘙	𓘚	𓘛	𓘜	𓘝	𓘞	𓘟
U+1362x	𓘠	𓘡	𓘢	𓘣	𓘤	𓘥	𓘦	𓘧	𓘨	𓘩	𓘪	𓘫	𓘬	𓘭	𓘮	𓘯
U+1363x	𓘰	𓘱	𓘲	𓘳	𓘴	𓘵	𓘶	𓘷	𓘸	𓘹	𓘺	𓘻	𓘼	𓘽	𓘾	𓘿
U+1364x	𓙀	𓙁	𓙂	𓙃	𓙄	𓙅	𓙆	𓙇	𓙈	𓙉	𓙊	𓙋	𓙌	𓙍	𓙎	𓙏
U+1365x	𓙐	𓙑	𓙒	𓙓	𓙔	𓙕	𓙖	𓙗	𓙘	𓙙	𓙚	𓙛	𓙜	𓙝	𓙞	𓙟
U+1366x	𓙠	𓙡	𓙢	𓙣	𓙤	𓙥	𓙦	𓙧	𓙨	𓙩	𓙪	𓙫	𓙬	𓙭	𓙮	𓙯
U+1367x	𓙰	𓙱	𓙲	𓙳	𓙴	𓙵	𓙶	𓙷	𓙸	𓙹	𓙺	𓙻	𓙼	𓙽	𓙾	𓙿
U+1368x	𓚀	𓚁	𓚂	𓚃	𓚄	𓚅	𓚆	𓚇	𓚈	𓚉	𓚊	𓚋	𓚌	𓚍	𓚎	𓚏
U+1369x	𓚐	𓚑	𓚒	𓚓	𓚔	𓚕	𓚖	𓚗	𓚘	𓚙	𓚚	𓚛	𓚜	𓚝	𓚞	𓚟
U+136Ax	𓚠	𓚡	𓚢	𓚣	𓚤	𓚥	𓚦	𓚧	𓚨	𓚩	𓚪	𓚫	𓚬	𓚭	𓚮	𓚯
U+136Bx	𓚰	𓚱	𓚲	𓚳	𓚴	𓚵	𓚶	𓚷	𓚸	𓚹	𓚺	𓚻	𓚼	𓚽	𓚾	𓚿
U+136Cx	𓛀	𓛁	𓛂	𓛃	𓛄	𓛅	𓛆	𓛇	𓛈	𓛉	𓛊	𓛋	𓛌	𓛍	𓛎	𓛏
U+136Dx	𓛐	𓛑	𓛒	𓛓	𓛔	𓛕	𓛖	𓛗	𓛘	𓛙	𓛚	𓛛	𓛜	𓛝	𓛞	𓛟
U+136Ex	𓛠	𓛡	𓛢	𓛣	𓛤	𓛥	𓛦	𓛧	𓛨	𓛩	𓛪	𓛫	𓛬	𓛭	𓛮	𓛯
U+136Fx	𓛰	𓛱	𓛲	𓛳	𓛴	𓛵	𓛶	𓛷	𓛸	𓛹	𓛺	𓛻	𓛼	𓛽	𓛾	𓛿
U+1370x	𓜀	𓜁	𓜂	𓜃	𓜄	𓜅	𓜆	𓜇	𓜈	𓜉	𓜊	𓜋	𓜌	𓜍	𓜎	𓜏
U+1371x	𓜐	𓜑	𓜒	𓜓	𓜔	𓜕	𓜖	𓜗	𓜘	𓜙	𓜚	𓜛	𓜜	𓜝	𓜞	𓜟
U+1372x	𓜠	𓜡	𓜢	𓜣	𓜤	𓜥	𓜦	𓜧	𓜨	𓜩	𓜪	𓜫	𓜬	𓜭	𓜮	𓜯
U+1373x	𓜰	𓜱	𓜲	𓜳	𓜴	𓜵	𓜶	𓜷	𓜸	𓜹	𓜺	𓜻	𓜼	𓜽	𓜾	𓜿
U+1374x	𓝀	𓝁	𓝂	𓝃	𓝄	𓝅	𓝆	𓝇	𓝈	𓝉	𓝊	𓝋	𓝌	𓝍	𓝎	𓝏
U+1375x	𓝐	𓝑	𓝒	𓝓	𓝔	𓝕	𓝖	𓝗	𓝘	𓝙	𓝚	𓝛	𓝜	𓝝	𓝞	𓝟
U+1376x	𓝠	𓝡	𓝢	𓝣	𓝤	𓝥	𓝦	𓝧	𓝨	𓝩	𓝪	𓝫	𓝬	𓝭	𓝮	𓝯
U+1377x	𓝰	𓝱	𓝲	𓝳	𓝴	𓝵	𓝶	𓝷	𓝸	𓝹	𓝺	𓝻	𓝼	𓝽	𓝾	𓝿
U+1378x	𓞀	𓞁	𓞂	𓞃	𓞄	𓞅	𓞆	𓞇	𓞈	𓞉	𓞊	𓞋	𓞌	𓞍	𓞎	𓞏
U+1379x	𓞐	𓞑	𓞒	𓞓	𓞔	𓞕	𓞖	𓞗	𓞘	𓞙	𓞚	𓞛	𓞜	𓞝	𓞞	𓞟
U+137Ax	𓞠	𓞡	𓞢	𓞣	𓞤	𓞥	𓞦	𓞧	𓞨	𓞩	𓞪	𓞫	𓞬	𓞭	𓞮	𓞯
U+137Bx	𓞰	𓞱	𓞲	𓞳	𓞴	𓞵	𓞶	𓞷	𓞸	𓞹	𓞺	𓞻	𓞼	𓞽	𓞾	𓞿
U+137Cx	𓟀	𓟁	𓟂	𓟃	𓟄	𓟅	𓟆	𓟇	𓟈	𓟉	𓟊	𓟋	𓟌	𓟍	𓟎	𓟏
U+137Dx	𓟐	𓟑	𓟒	𓟓	𓟔	𓟕	𓟖	𓟗	𓟘	𓟙	𓟚	𓟛	𓟜	𓟝	𓟞	𓟟
U+137Ex	𓟠	𓟡	𓟢	𓟣	𓟤	𓟥	𓟦	𓟧	𓟨	𓟩	𓟪	𓟫	𓟬	𓟭	𓟮	𓟯
U+137Fx	𓟰	𓟱	𓟲	𓟳	𓟴	𓟵	𓟶	𓟷	𓟸	𓟹	𓟺	𓟻	𓟼	𓟽	𓟾	𓟿
U+1380x	𓠀	𓠁	𓠂	𓠃	𓠄	𓠅	𓠆	𓠇	𓠈	𓠉	𓠊	𓠋	𓠌	𓠍	𓠎	𓠏
U+1381x	𓠐	𓠑	𓠒	𓠓	𓠔	𓠕	𓠖	𓠗	𓠘	𓠙	𓠚	𓠛	𓠜	𓠝	𓠞	𓠟
U+1382x	𓠠	𓠡	𓠢	𓠣	𓠤	𓠥	𓠦	𓠧	𓠨	𓠩	𓠪	𓠫	𓠬	𓠭	𓠮	𓠯
U+1383x	𓠰	𓠱	𓠲	𓠳	𓠴	𓠵	𓠶	𓠷	𓠸	𓠹	𓠺	𓠻	𓠼	𓠽	𓠾	𓠿
U+1384x	𓡀	𓡁	𓡂	𓡃	𓡄	𓡅	𓡆	𓡇	𓡈	𓡉	𓡊	𓡋	𓡌	𓡍	𓡎	𓡏
U+1385x	𓡐	𓡑	𓡒	𓡓	𓡔	𓡕	𓡖	𓡗	𓡘	𓡙	𓡚	𓡛	𓡜	𓡝	𓡞	𓡟
U+1386x	𓡠	𓡡	𓡢	𓡣	𓡤	𓡥	𓡦	𓡧	𓡨	𓡩	𓡪	𓡫	𓡬	𓡭	𓡮	𓡯
U+1387x	𓡰	𓡱	𓡲	𓡳	𓡴	𓡵	𓡶	𓡷	𓡸	𓡹	𓡺	𓡻	𓡼	𓡽	𓡾	𓡿
U+1388x	𓢀	𓢁	𓢂	𓢃	𓢄	𓢅	𓢆	𓢇	𓢈	𓢉	𓢊	𓢋	𓢌	𓢍	𓢎	𓢏
U+1389x	𓢐	𓢑	𓢒	𓢓	𓢔	𓢕	𓢖	𓢗	𓢘	𓢙	𓢚	𓢛	𓢜	𓢝	𓢞	𓢟
U+138Ax	𓢠	𓢡	𓢢	𓢣	𓢤	𓢥	𓢦	𓢧	𓢨	𓢩	𓢪	𓢫	𓢬	𓢭	𓢮	𓢯
U+138Bx	𓢰	𓢱	𓢲	𓢳	𓢴	𓢵	𓢶	𓢷	𓢸	𓢹	𓢺	𓢻	𓢼	𓢽	𓢾	𓢿
U+138Cx	𓣀	𓣁	𓣂	𓣃	𓣄	𓣅	𓣆	𓣇	𓣈	𓣉	𓣊	𓣋	𓣌	𓣍	𓣎	𓣏
U+138Dx	𓣐	𓣑	𓣒	𓣓	𓣔	𓣕	𓣖	𓣗	𓣘	𓣙	𓣚	𓣛	𓣜	𓣝	𓣞	𓣟
U+138Ex	𓣠	𓣡	𓣢	𓣣	𓣤	𓣥	𓣦	𓣧	𓣨	𓣩	𓣪	𓣫	𓣬	𓣭	𓣮	𓣯
U+138Fx	𓣰	𓣱	𓣲	𓣳	𓣴	𓣵	𓣶	𓣷	𓣸	𓣹	𓣺	𓣻	𓣼	𓣽	𓣾	𓣿
U+1390x	𓤀	𓤁	𓤂	𓤃	𓤄	𓤅	𓤆	𓤇	𓤈	𓤉	𓤊	𓤋	𓤌	𓤍	𓤎	𓤏
U+1391x	𓤐	𓤑	𓤒	𓤓	𓤔	𓤕	𓤖	𓤗	𓤘	𓤙	𓤚	𓤛	𓤜	𓤝	𓤞	𓤟
U+1392x	𓤠	𓤡	𓤢	𓤣	𓤤	𓤥	𓤦	𓤧	𓤨	𓤩	𓤪	𓤫	𓤬	𓤭	𓤮	𓤯
U+1393x	𓤰	𓤱	𓤲	𓤳	𓤴	𓤵	𓤶	𓤷	𓤸	𓤹	𓤺	𓤻	𓤼	𓤽	𓤾	𓤿
U+1394x	𓥀	𓥁	𓥂	𓥃	𓥄	𓥅	𓥆	𓥇	𓥈	𓥉	𓥊	𓥋	𓥌	𓥍	𓥎	𓥏
U+1395x	𓥐	𓥑	𓥒	𓥓	𓥔	𓥕	𓥖	𓥗	𓥘	𓥙	𓥚	𓥛	𓥜	𓥝	𓥞	𓥟
U+1396x	𓥠	𓥡	𓥢	𓥣	𓥤	𓥥	𓥦	𓥧	𓥨	𓥩	𓥪	𓥫	𓥬	𓥭	𓥮	𓥯
U+1397x	𓥰	𓥱	𓥲	𓥳	𓥴	𓥵	𓥶	𓥷	𓥸	𓥹	𓥺	𓥻	𓥼	𓥽	𓥾	𓥿
U+1398x	𓦀	𓦁	𓦂	𓦃	𓦄	𓦅	𓦆	𓦇	𓦈	𓦉	𓦊	𓦋	𓦌	𓦍	𓦎	𓦏
U+1399x	𓦐	𓦑	𓦒	𓦓	𓦔	𓦕	𓦖	𓦗	𓦘	𓦙	𓦚	𓦛	𓦜	𓦝	𓦞	𓦟
U+139Ax	𓦠	𓦡	𓦢	𓦣	𓦤	𓦥	𓦦	𓦧	𓦨	𓦩	𓦪	𓦫	𓦬	𓦭	𓦮	𓦯
U+139Bx	𓦰	𓦱	𓦲	𓦳	𓦴	𓦵	𓦶	𓦷	𓦸	𓦹	𓦺	𓦻	𓦼	𓦽	𓦾	𓦿
U+139Cx	𓧀	𓧁	𓧂	𓧃	𓧄	𓧅	𓧆	𓧇	𓧈	𓧉	𓧊	𓧋	𓧌	𓧍	𓧎	𓧏
U+139Dx	𓧐	𓧑	𓧒	𓧓	𓧔	𓧕	𓧖	𓧗	𓧘	𓧙	𓧚	𓧛	𓧜	𓧝	𓧞	𓧟
U+139Ex	𓧠	𓧡	𓧢	𓧣	𓧤	𓧥	𓧦	𓧧	𓧨	𓧩	𓧪	𓧫	𓧬	𓧭	𓧮	𓧯
U+139Fx	𓧰	𓧱	𓧲	𓧳	𓧴	𓧵	𓧶	𓧷	𓧸	𓧹	𓧺	𓧻	𓧼	𓧽	𓧾	𓧿
U+13A0x	𓨀	𓨁	𓨂	𓨃	𓨄	𓨅	𓨆	𓨇	𓨈	𓨉	𓨊	𓨋	𓨌	𓨍	𓨎	𓨏
U+13A1x	𓨐	𓨑	𓨒	𓨓	𓨔	𓨕	𓨖	𓨗	𓨘	𓨙	𓨚	𓨛	𓨜	𓨝	𓨞	𓨟
U+13A2x	𓨠	𓨡	𓨢	𓨣	𓨤	𓨥	𓨦	𓨧	𓨨	𓨩	𓨪	𓨫	𓨬	𓨭	𓨮	𓨯
U+13A3x	𓨰	𓨱	𓨲	𓨳	𓨴	𓨵	𓨶	𓨷	𓨸	𓨹	𓨺	𓨻	𓨼	𓨽	𓨾	𓨿
U+13A4x	𓩀	𓩁	𓩂	𓩃	𓩄	𓩅	𓩆	𓩇	𓩈	𓩉	𓩊	𓩋	𓩌	𓩍	𓩎	𓩏
U+13A5x	𓩐	𓩑	𓩒	𓩓	𓩔	𓩕	𓩖	𓩗	𓩘	𓩙	𓩚	𓩛	𓩜	𓩝	𓩞	𓩟
U+13A6x	𓩠	𓩡	𓩢	𓩣	𓩤	𓩥	𓩦	𓩧	𓩨	𓩩	𓩪	𓩫	𓩬	𓩭	𓩮	𓩯
U+13A7x	𓩰	𓩱	𓩲	𓩳	𓩴	𓩵	𓩶	𓩷	𓩸	𓩹	𓩺	𓩻	𓩼	𓩽	𓩾	𓩿
U+13A8x	𓪀	𓪁	𓪂	𓪃	𓪄	𓪅	𓪆	𓪇	𓪈	𓪉	𓪊	𓪋	𓪌	𓪍	𓪎	𓪏
U+13A9x	𓪐	𓪑	𓪒	𓪓	𓪔	𓪕	𓪖	𓪗	𓪘	𓪙	𓪚	𓪛	𓪜	𓪝	𓪞	𓪟
U+13AAx	𓪠	𓪡	𓪢	𓪣	𓪤	𓪥	𓪦	𓪧	𓪨	𓪩	𓪪	𓪫	𓪬	𓪭	𓪮	𓪯
U+13ABx	𓪰	𓪱	𓪲	𓪳	𓪴	𓪵	𓪶	𓪷	𓪸	𓪹	𓪺	𓪻	𓪼	𓪽	𓪾	𓪿
U+13ACx	𓫀	𓫁	𓫂	𓫃	𓫄	𓫅	𓫆	𓫇	𓫈	𓫉	𓫊	𓫋	𓫌	𓫍	𓫎	𓫏
U+13ADx	𓫐	𓫑	𓫒	𓫓	𓫔	𓫕	𓫖	𓫗	𓫘	𓫙	𓫚	𓫛	𓫜	𓫝	𓫞	𓫟
U+13AEx	𓫠	𓫡	𓫢	𓫣	𓫤	𓫥	𓫦	𓫧	𓫨	𓫩	𓫪	𓫫	𓫬	𓫭	𓫮	𓫯
U+13AFx	𓫰	𓫱	𓫲	𓫳	𓫴	𓫵	𓫶	𓫷	𓫸	𓫹	𓫺	𓫻	𓫼	𓫽	𓫾	𓫿
U+13B0x	𓬀	𓬁	𓬂	𓬃	𓬄	𓬅	𓬆	𓬇	𓬈	𓬉	𓬊	𓬋	𓬌	𓬍	𓬎	𓬏
U+13B1x	𓬐	𓬑	𓬒	𓬓	𓬔	𓬕	𓬖	𓬗	𓬘	𓬙	𓬚	𓬛	𓬜	𓬝	𓬞	𓬟
U+13B2x	𓬠	𓬡	𓬢	𓬣	𓬤	𓬥	𓬦	𓬧	𓬨	𓬩	𓬪	𓬫	𓬬	𓬭	𓬮	𓬯
U+13B3x	𓬰	𓬱	𓬲	𓬳	𓬴	𓬵	𓬶	𓬷	𓬸	𓬹	𓬺	𓬻	𓬼	𓬽	𓬾	𓬿
U+13B4x	𓭀	𓭁	𓭂	𓭃	𓭄	𓭅	𓭆	𓭇	𓭈	𓭉	𓭊	𓭋	𓭌	𓭍	𓭎	𓭏
U+13B5x	𓭐	𓭑	𓭒	𓭓	𓭔	𓭕	𓭖	𓭗	𓭘	𓭙	𓭚	𓭛	𓭜	𓭝	𓭞	𓭟
U+13B6x	𓭠	𓭡	𓭢	𓭣	𓭤	𓭥	𓭦	𓭧	𓭨	𓭩	𓭪	𓭫	𓭬	𓭭	𓭮	𓭯
U+13B7x	𓭰	𓭱	𓭲	𓭳	𓭴	𓭵	𓭶	𓭷	𓭸	𓭹	𓭺	𓭻	𓭼	𓭽	𓭾	𓭿
U+13B8x	𓮀	𓮁	𓮂	𓮃	𓮄	𓮅	𓮆	𓮇	𓮈	𓮉	𓮊	𓮋	𓮌	𓮍	𓮎	𓮏
U+13B9x	𓮐	𓮑	𓮒	𓮓	𓮔	𓮕	𓮖	𓮗	𓮘	𓮙	𓮚	𓮛	𓮜	𓮝	𓮞	𓮟
U+13BAx	𓮠	𓮡	𓮢	𓮣	𓮤	𓮥	𓮦	𓮧	𓮨	𓮩	𓮪	𓮫	𓮬	𓮭	𓮮	𓮯
U+13BBx	𓮰	𓮱	𓮲	𓮳	𓮴	𓮵	𓮶	𓮷	𓮸	𓮹	𓮺	𓮻	𓮼	𓮽	𓮾	𓮿
U+13BCx	𓯀	𓯁	𓯂	𓯃	𓯄	𓯅	𓯆	𓯇	𓯈	𓯉	𓯊	𓯋	𓯌	𓯍	𓯎	𓯏
U+13BDx	𓯐	𓯑	𓯒	𓯓	𓯔	𓯕	𓯖	𓯗	𓯘	𓯙	𓯚	𓯛	𓯜	𓯝	𓯞	𓯟
U+13BEx	𓯠	𓯡	𓯢	𓯣	𓯤	𓯥	𓯦	𓯧	𓯨	𓯩	𓯪	𓯫	𓯬	𓯭	𓯮	𓯯
U+13BFx	𓯰	𓯱	𓯲	𓯳	𓯴	𓯵	𓯶	𓯷	𓯸	𓯹	𓯺	𓯻	𓯼	𓯽	𓯾	𓯿
U+13C0x	𓰀	𓰁	𓰂	𓰃	𓰄	𓰅	𓰆	𓰇	𓰈	𓰉	𓰊	𓰋	𓰌	𓰍	𓰎	𓰏
U+13C1x	𓰐	𓰑	𓰒	𓰓	𓰔	𓰕	𓰖	𓰗	𓰘	𓰙	𓰚	𓰛	𓰜	𓰝	𓰞	𓰟
U+13C2x	𓰠	𓰡	𓰢	𓰣	𓰤	𓰥	𓰦	𓰧	𓰨	𓰩	𓰪	𓰫	𓰬	𓰭	𓰮	𓰯
U+13C3x	𓰰	𓰱	𓰲	𓰳	𓰴	𓰵	𓰶	𓰷	𓰸	𓰹	𓰺	𓰻	𓰼	𓰽	𓰾	𓰿
U+13C4x	𓱀	𓱁	𓱂	𓱃	𓱄	𓱅	𓱆	𓱇	𓱈	𓱉	𓱊	𓱋	𓱌	𓱍	𓱎	𓱏
U+13C5x	𓱐	𓱑	𓱒	𓱓	𓱔	𓱕	𓱖	𓱗	𓱘	𓱙	𓱚	𓱛	𓱜	𓱝	𓱞	𓱟
U+13C6x	𓱠	𓱡	𓱢	𓱣	𓱤	𓱥	𓱦	𓱧	𓱨	𓱩	𓱪	𓱫	𓱬	𓱭	𓱮	𓱯
U+13C7x	𓱰	𓱱	𓱲	𓱳	𓱴	𓱵	𓱶	𓱷	𓱸	𓱹	𓱺	𓱻	𓱼	𓱽	𓱾	𓱿
U+13C8x	𓲀	𓲁	𓲂	𓲃	𓲄	𓲅	𓲆	𓲇	𓲈	𓲉	𓲊	𓲋	𓲌	𓲍	𓲎	𓲏
U+13C9x	𓲐	𓲑	𓲒	𓲓	𓲔	𓲕	𓲖	𓲗	𓲘	𓲙	𓲚	𓲛	𓲜	𓲝	𓲞	𓲟
U+13CAx	𓲠	𓲡	𓲢	𓲣	𓲤	𓲥	𓲦	𓲧	𓲨	𓲩	𓲪	𓲫	𓲬	𓲭	𓲮	𓲯
U+13CBx	𓲰	𓲱	𓲲	𓲳	𓲴	𓲵	𓲶	𓲷	𓲸	𓲹	𓲺	𓲻	𓲼	𓲽	𓲾	𓲿
U+13CCx	𓳀	𓳁	𓳂	𓳃	𓳄	𓳅	𓳆	𓳇	𓳈	𓳉	𓳊	𓳋	𓳌	𓳍	𓳎	𓳏
U+13CDx	𓳐	𓳑	𓳒	𓳓	𓳔	𓳕	𓳖	𓳗	𓳘	𓳙	𓳚	𓳛	𓳜	𓳝	𓳞	𓳟
U+13CEx	𓳠	𓳡	𓳢	𓳣	𓳤	𓳥	𓳦	𓳧	𓳨	𓳩	𓳪	𓳫	𓳬	𓳭	𓳮	𓳯
U+13CFx	𓳰	𓳱	𓳲	𓳳	𓳴	𓳵	𓳶	𓳷	𓳸	𓳹	𓳺	𓳻	𓳼	𓳽	𓳾	𓳿
U+13D0x	𓴀	𓴁	𓴂	𓴃	𓴄	𓴅	𓴆	𓴇	𓴈	𓴉	𓴊	𓴋	𓴌	𓴍	𓴎	𓴏
U+13D1x	𓴐	𓴑	𓴒	𓴓	𓴔	𓴕	𓴖	𓴗	𓴘	𓴙	𓴚	𓴛	𓴜	𓴝	𓴞	𓴟
U+13D2x	𓴠	𓴡	𓴢	𓴣	𓴤	𓴥	𓴦	𓴧	𓴨	𓴩	𓴪	𓴫	𓴬	𓴭	𓴮	𓴯
U+13D3x	𓴰	𓴱	𓴲	𓴳	𓴴	𓴵	𓴶	𓴷	𓴸	𓴹	𓴺	𓴻	𓴼	𓴽	𓴾	𓴿
U+13D4x	𓵀	𓵁	𓵂	𓵃	𓵄	𓵅	𓵆	𓵇	𓵈	𓵉	𓵊	𓵋	𓵌	𓵍	𓵎	𓵏
U+13D5x	𓵐	𓵑	𓵒	𓵓	𓵔	𓵕	𓵖	𓵗	𓵘	𓵙	𓵚	𓵛	𓵜	𓵝	𓵞	𓵟
U+13D6x	𓵠	𓵡	𓵢	𓵣	𓵤	𓵥	𓵦	𓵧	𓵨	𓵩	𓵪	𓵫	𓵬	𓵭	𓵮	𓵯
U+13D7x	𓵰	𓵱	𓵲	𓵳	𓵴	𓵵	𓵶	𓵷	𓵸	𓵹	𓵺	𓵻	𓵼	𓵽	𓵾	𓵿
U+13D8x	𓶀	𓶁	𓶂	𓶃	𓶄	𓶅	𓶆	𓶇	𓶈	𓶉	𓶊	𓶋	𓶌	𓶍	𓶎	𓶏
U+13D9x	𓶐	𓶑	𓶒	𓶓	𓶔	𓶕	𓶖	𓶗	𓶘	𓶙	𓶚	𓶛	𓶜	𓶝	𓶞	𓶟
U+13DAx	𓶠	𓶡	𓶢	𓶣	𓶤	𓶥	𓶦	𓶧	𓶨	𓶩	𓶪	𓶫	𓶬	𓶭	𓶮	𓶯
U+13DBx	𓶰	𓶱	𓶲	𓶳	𓶴	𓶵	𓶶	𓶷	𓶸	𓶹	𓶺	𓶻	𓶼	𓶽	𓶾	𓶿
U+13DCx	𓷀	𓷁	𓷂	𓷃	𓷄	𓷅	𓷆	𓷇	𓷈	𓷉	𓷊	𓷋	𓷌	𓷍	𓷎	𓷏
U+13DDx	𓷐	𓷑	𓷒	𓷓	𓷔	𓷕	𓷖	𓷗	𓷘	𓷙	𓷚	𓷛	𓷜	𓷝	𓷞	𓷟
U+13DEx	𓷠	𓷡	𓷢	𓷣	𓷤	𓷥	𓷦	𓷧	𓷨	𓷩	𓷪	𓷫	𓷬	𓷭	𓷮	𓷯
U+13DFx	𓷰	𓷱	𓷲	𓷳	𓷴	𓷵	𓷶	𓷷	𓷸	𓷹	𓷺	𓷻	𓷼	𓷽	𓷾	𓷿
U+13E0x	𓸀	𓸁	𓸂	𓸃	𓸄	𓸅	𓸆	𓸇	𓸈	𓸉	𓸊	𓸋	𓸌	𓸍	𓸎	𓸏
U+13E1x	𓸐	𓸑	𓸒	𓸓	𓸔	𓸕	𓸖	𓸗	𓸘	𓸙	𓸚	𓸛	𓸜	𓸝	𓸞	𓸟
U+13E2x	𓸠	𓸡	𓸢	𓸣	𓸤	𓸥	𓸦	𓸧	𓸨	𓸩	𓸪	𓸫	𓸬	𓸭	𓸮	𓸯
U+13E3x	𓸰	𓸱	𓸲	𓸳	𓸴	𓸵	𓸶	𓸷	𓸸	𓸹	𓸺	𓸻	𓸼	𓸽	𓸾	𓸿
U+13E4x	𓹀	𓹁	𓹂	𓹃	𓹄	𓹅	𓹆	𓹇	𓹈	𓹉	𓹊	𓹋	𓹌	𓹍	𓹎	𓹏
U+13E5x	𓹐	𓹑	𓹒	𓹓	𓹔	𓹕	𓹖	𓹗	𓹘	𓹙	𓹚	𓹛	𓹜	𓹝	𓹞	𓹟
U+13E6x	𓹠	𓹡	𓹢	𓹣	𓹤	𓹥	𓹦	𓹧	𓹨	𓹩	𓹪	𓹫	𓹬	𓹭	𓹮	𓹯
U+13E7x	𓹰	𓹱	𓹲	𓹳	𓹴	𓹵	𓹶	𓹷	𓹸	𓹹	𓹺	𓹻	𓹼	𓹽	𓹾	𓹿
U+13E8x	𓺀	𓺁	𓺂	𓺃	𓺄	𓺅	𓺆	𓺇	𓺈	𓺉	𓺊	𓺋	𓺌	𓺍	𓺎	𓺏
U+13E9x	𓺐	𓺑	𓺒	𓺓	𓺔	𓺕	𓺖	𓺗	𓺘	𓺙	𓺚	𓺛	𓺜	𓺝	𓺞	𓺟
U+13EAx	𓺠	𓺡	𓺢	𓺣	𓺤	𓺥	𓺦	𓺧	𓺨	𓺩	𓺪	𓺫	𓺬	𓺭	𓺮	𓺯
U+13EBx	𓺰	𓺱	𓺲	𓺳	𓺴	𓺵	𓺶	𓺷	𓺸	𓺹	𓺺	𓺻	𓺼	𓺽	𓺾	𓺿
U+13ECx	𓻀	𓻁	𓻂	𓻃	𓻄	𓻅	𓻆	𓻇	𓻈	𓻉	𓻊	𓻋	𓻌	𓻍	𓻎	𓻏
U+13EDx	𓻐	𓻑	𓻒	𓻓	𓻔	𓻕	𓻖	𓻗	𓻘	𓻙	𓻚	𓻛	𓻜	𓻝	𓻞	𓻟
U+13EEx	𓻠	𓻡	𓻢	𓻣	𓻤	𓻥	𓻦	𓻧	𓻨	𓻩	𓻪	𓻫	𓻬	𓻭	𓻮	𓻯
U+13EFx	𓻰	𓻱	𓻲	𓻳	𓻴	𓻵	𓻶	𓻷	𓻸	𓻹	𓻺	𓻻	𓻼	𓻽	𓻾	𓻿
U+13F0x	𓼀	𓼁	𓼂	𓼃	𓼄	𓼅	𓼆	𓼇	𓼈	𓼉	𓼊	𓼋	𓼌	𓼍	𓼎	𓼏
U+13F1x	𓼐	𓼑	𓼒	𓼓	𓼔	𓼕	𓼖	𓼗	𓼘	𓼙	𓼚	𓼛	𓼜	𓼝	𓼞	𓼟
U+13F2x	𓼠	𓼡	𓼢	𓼣	𓼤	𓼥	𓼦	𓼧	𓼨	𓼩	𓼪	𓼫	𓼬	𓼭	𓼮	𓼯
U+13F3x	𓼰	𓼱	𓼲	𓼳	𓼴	𓼵	𓼶	𓼷	𓼸	𓼹	𓼺	𓼻	𓼼	𓼽	𓼾	𓼿
U+13F4x	𓽀	𓽁	𓽂	𓽃	𓽄	𓽅	𓽆	𓽇	𓽈	𓽉	𓽊	𓽋	𓽌	𓽍	𓽎	𓽏
U+13F5x	𓽐	𓽑	𓽒	𓽓	𓽔	𓽕	𓽖	𓽗	𓽘	𓽙	𓽚	𓽛	𓽜	𓽝	𓽞	𓽟
U+13F6x	𓽠	𓽡	𓽢	𓽣	𓽤	𓽥	𓽦	𓽧	𓽨	𓽩	𓽪	𓽫	𓽬	𓽭	𓽮	𓽯
U+13F7x	𓽰	𓽱	𓽲	𓽳	𓽴	𓽵	𓽶	𓽷	𓽸	𓽹	𓽺	𓽻	𓽼	𓽽	𓽾	𓽿
U+13F8x	𓾀	𓾁	𓾂	𓾃	𓾄	𓾅	𓾆	𓾇	𓾈	𓾉	𓾊	𓾋	𓾌	𓾍	𓾎	𓾏
U+13F9x	𓾐	𓾑	𓾒	𓾓	𓾔	𓾕	𓾖	𓾗	𓾘	𓾙	𓾚	𓾛	𓾜	𓾝	𓾞	𓾟
U+13FAx	𓾠	𓾡	𓾢	𓾣	𓾤	𓾥	𓾦	𓾧	𓾨	𓾩	𓾪	𓾫	𓾬	𓾭	𓾮	𓾯
U+13FBx	𓾰	𓾱	𓾲	𓾳	𓾴	𓾵	𓾶	𓾷	𓾸	𓾹	𓾺	𓾻	𓾼	𓾽	𓾾	𓾿
U+13FCx	𓿀	𓿁	𓿂	𓿃	𓿄	𓿅	𓿆	𓿇	𓿈	𓿉	𓿊	𓿋	𓿌	𓿍	𓿎	𓿏
U+13FDx	𓿐	𓿑	𓿒	𓿓	𓿔	𓿕	𓿖	𓿗	𓿘	𓿙	𓿚	𓿛	𓿜	𓿝	𓿞	𓿟
U+13FEx	𓿠	𓿡	𓿢	𓿣	𓿤	𓿥	𓿦	𓿧	𓿨	𓿩	𓿪	𓿫	𓿬	𓿭	𓿮	𓿯
U+13FFx	𓿰	𓿱	𓿲	𓿳	𓿴	𓿵	𓿶	𓿷	𓿸	𓿹	𓿺	𓿻	𓿼	𓿽	𓿾	𓿿
U+1400x	𔀀	𔀁	𔀂	𔀃	𔀄	𔀅	𔀆	𔀇	𔀈	𔀉	𔀊	𔀋	𔀌	𔀍	𔀎	𔀏
U+1401x	𔀐	𔀑	𔀒	𔀓	𔀔	𔀕	𔀖	𔀗	𔀘	𔀙	𔀚	𔀛	𔀜	𔀝	𔀞	𔀟
U+1402x	𔀠	𔀡	𔀢	𔀣	𔀤	𔀥	𔀦	𔀧	𔀨	𔀩	𔀪	𔀫	𔀬	𔀭	𔀮	𔀯
U+1403x	𔀰	𔀱	𔀲	𔀳	𔀴	𔀵	𔀶	𔀷	𔀸	𔀹	𔀺	𔀻	𔀼	𔀽	𔀾	𔀿
U+1404x	𔁀	𔁁	𔁂	𔁃	𔁄	𔁅	𔁆	𔁇	𔁈	𔁉	𔁊	𔁋	𔁌	𔁍	𔁎	𔁏
U+1405x	𔁐	𔁑	𔁒	𔁓	𔁔	𔁕	𔁖	𔁗	𔁘	𔁙	𔁚	𔁛	𔁜	𔁝	𔁞	𔁟
U+1406x	𔁠	𔁡	𔁢	𔁣	𔁤	𔁥	𔁦	𔁧	𔁨	𔁩	𔁪	𔁫	𔁬	𔁭	𔁮	𔁯
U+1407x	𔁰	𔁱	𔁲	𔁳	𔁴	𔁵	𔁶	𔁷	𔁸	𔁹	𔁺	𔁻	𔁼	𔁽	𔁾	𔁿
U+1408x	𔂀	𔂁	𔂂	𔂃	𔂄	𔂅	𔂆	𔂇	𔂈	𔂉	𔂊	𔂋	𔂌	𔂍	𔂎	𔂏
U+1409x	𔂐	𔂑	𔂒	𔂓	𔂔	𔂕	𔂖	𔂗	𔂘	𔂙	𔂚	𔂛	𔂜	𔂝	𔂞	𔂟
U+140Ax	𔂠	𔂡	𔂢	𔂣	𔂤	𔂥	𔂦	𔂧	𔂨	𔂩	𔂪	𔂫	𔂬	𔂭	𔂮	𔂯
U+140Bx	𔂰	𔂱	𔂲	𔂳	𔂴	𔂵	𔂶	𔂷	𔂸	𔂹	𔂺	𔂻	𔂼	𔂽	𔂾	𔂿
U+140Cx	𔃀	𔃁	𔃂	𔃃	𔃄	𔃅	𔃆	𔃇	𔃈	𔃉	𔃊	𔃋	𔃌	𔃍	𔃎	𔃏
U+140Dx	𔃐	𔃑	𔃒	𔃓	𔃔	𔃕	𔃖	𔃗	𔃘	𔃙	𔃚	𔃛	𔃜	𔃝	𔃞	𔃟
U+140Ex	𔃠	𔃡	𔃢	𔃣	𔃤	𔃥	𔃦	𔃧	𔃨	𔃩	𔃪	𔃫	𔃬	𔃭	𔃮	𔃯
U+140Fx	𔃰	𔃱	𔃲	𔃳	𔃴	𔃵	𔃶	𔃷	𔃸	𔃹	𔃺	𔃻	𔃼	𔃽	𔃾	𔃿
U+1410x	𔄀	𔄁	𔄂	𔄃	𔄄	𔄅	𔄆	𔄇	𔄈	𔄉	𔄊	𔄋	𔄌	𔄍	𔄎	𔄏
U+1411x	𔄐	𔄑	𔄒	𔄓	𔄔	𔄕	𔄖	𔄗	𔄘	𔄙	𔄚	𔄛	𔄜	𔄝	𔄞	𔄟
U+1412x	𔄠	𔄡	𔄢	𔄣	𔄤	𔄥	𔄦	𔄧	𔄨	𔄩	𔄪	𔄫	𔄬	𔄭	𔄮	𔄯
U+1413x	𔄰	𔄱	𔄲	𔄳	𔄴	𔄵	𔄶	𔄷	𔄸	𔄹	𔄺	𔄻	𔄼	𔄽	𔄾	𔄿
U+1414x	𔅀	𔅁	𔅂	𔅃	𔅄	𔅅	𔅆	𔅇	𔅈	𔅉	𔅊	𔅋	𔅌	𔅍	𔅎	𔅏
U+1415x	𔅐	𔅑	𔅒	𔅓	𔅔	𔅕	𔅖	𔅗	𔅘	𔅙	𔅚	𔅛	𔅜	𔅝	𔅞	𔅟
U+1416x	𔅠	𔅡	𔅢	𔅣	𔅤	𔅥	𔅦	𔅧	𔅨	𔅩	𔅪	𔅫	𔅬	𔅭	𔅮	𔅯
U+1417x	𔅰	𔅱	𔅲	𔅳	𔅴	𔅵	𔅶	𔅷	𔅸	𔅹	𔅺	𔅻	𔅼	𔅽	𔅾	𔅿
U+1418x	𔆀	𔆁	𔆂	𔆃	𔆄	𔆅	𔆆	𔆇	𔆈	𔆉	𔆊	𔆋	𔆌	𔆍	𔆎	𔆏
U+1419x	𔆐	𔆑	𔆒	𔆓	𔆔	𔆕	𔆖	𔆗	𔆘	𔆙	𔆚	𔆛	𔆜	𔆝	𔆞	𔆟
U+141Ax	𔆠	𔆡	𔆢	𔆣	𔆤	𔆥	𔆦	𔆧	𔆨	𔆩	𔆪	𔆫	𔆬	𔆭	𔆮	𔆯
U+141Bx	𔆰	𔆱	𔆲	𔆳	𔆴	𔆵	𔆶	𔆷	𔆸	𔆹	𔆺	𔆻	𔆼	𔆽	𔆾	𔆿
U+141Cx	𔇀	𔇁	𔇂	𔇃	𔇄	𔇅	𔇆	𔇇	𔇈	𔇉	𔇊	𔇋	𔇌	𔇍	𔇎	𔇏
U+141Dx	𔇐	𔇑	𔇒	𔇓	𔇔	𔇕	𔇖	𔇗	𔇘	𔇙	𔇚	𔇛	𔇜	𔇝	𔇞	𔇟
U+141Ex	𔇠	𔇡	𔇢	𔇣	𔇤	𔇥	𔇦	𔇧	𔇨	𔇩	𔇪	𔇫	𔇬	𔇭	𔇮	𔇯
U+141Fx	𔇰	𔇱	𔇲	𔇳	𔇴	𔇵	𔇶	𔇷	𔇸	𔇹	𔇺	𔇻	𔇼	𔇽	𔇾	𔇿
U+1420x	𔈀	𔈁	𔈂	𔈃	𔈄	𔈅	𔈆	𔈇	𔈈	𔈉	𔈊	𔈋	𔈌	𔈍	𔈎	𔈏
U+1421x	𔈐	𔈑	𔈒	𔈓	𔈔	𔈕	𔈖	𔈗	𔈘	𔈙	𔈚	𔈛	𔈜	𔈝	𔈞	𔈟
U+1422x	𔈠	𔈡	𔈢	𔈣	𔈤	𔈥	𔈦	𔈧	𔈨	𔈩	𔈪	𔈫	𔈬	𔈭	𔈮	𔈯
U+1423x	𔈰	𔈱	𔈲	𔈳	𔈴	𔈵	𔈶	𔈷	𔈸	𔈹	𔈺	𔈻	𔈼	𔈽	𔈾	𔈿
U+1424x	𔉀	𔉁	𔉂	𔉃	𔉄	𔉅	𔉆	𔉇	𔉈	𔉉	𔉊	𔉋	𔉌	𔉍	𔉎	𔉏
U+1425x	𔉐	𔉑	𔉒	𔉓	𔉔	𔉕	𔉖	𔉗	𔉘	𔉙	𔉚	𔉛	𔉜	𔉝	𔉞	𔉟
U+1426x	𔉠	𔉡	𔉢	𔉣	𔉤	𔉥	𔉦	𔉧	𔉨	𔉩	𔉪	𔉫	𔉬	𔉭	𔉮	𔉯
U+1427x	𔉰	𔉱	𔉲	𔉳	𔉴	𔉵	𔉶	𔉷	𔉸	𔉹	𔉺	𔉻	𔉼	𔉽	𔉾	𔉿
U+1428x	𔊀	𔊁	𔊂	𔊃	𔊄	𔊅	𔊆	𔊇	𔊈	𔊉	𔊊	𔊋	𔊌	𔊍	𔊎	𔊏
U+1429x	𔊐	𔊑	𔊒	𔊓	𔊔	𔊕	𔊖	𔊗	𔊘	𔊙	𔊚	𔊛	𔊜	𔊝	𔊞	𔊟
U+142Ax	𔊠	𔊡	𔊢	𔊣	𔊤	𔊥	𔊦	𔊧	𔊨	𔊩	𔊪	𔊫	𔊬	𔊭	𔊮	𔊯
U+142Bx	𔊰	𔊱	𔊲	𔊳	𔊴	𔊵	𔊶	𔊷	𔊸	𔊹	𔊺	𔊻	𔊼	𔊽	𔊾	𔊿
U+142Cx	𔋀	𔋁	𔋂	𔋃	𔋄	𔋅	𔋆	𔋇	𔋈	𔋉	𔋊	𔋋	𔋌	𔋍	𔋎	𔋏
U+142Dx	𔋐	𔋑	𔋒	𔋓	𔋔	𔋕	𔋖	𔋗	𔋘	𔋙	𔋚	𔋛	𔋜	𔋝	𔋞	𔋟
U+142Ex	𔋠	𔋡	𔋢	𔋣	𔋤	𔋥	𔋦	𔋧	𔋨	𔋩	𔋪	𔋫	𔋬	𔋭	𔋮	𔋯
U+142Fx	𔋰	𔋱	𔋲	𔋳	𔋴	𔋵	𔋶	𔋷	𔋸	𔋹	𔋺	𔋻	𔋼	𔋽	𔋾	𔋿
U+1430x	𔌀	𔌁	𔌂	𔌃	𔌄	𔌅	𔌆	𔌇	𔌈	𔌉	𔌊	𔌋	𔌌	𔌍	𔌎	𔌏
U+1431x	𔌐	𔌑	𔌒	𔌓	𔌔	𔌕	𔌖	𔌗	𔌘	𔌙	𔌚	𔌛	𔌜	𔌝	𔌞	𔌟
U+1432x	𔌠	𔌡	𔌢	𔌣	𔌤	𔌥	𔌦	𔌧	𔌨	𔌩	𔌪	𔌫	𔌬	𔌭	𔌮	𔌯
U+1433x	𔌰	𔌱	𔌲	𔌳	𔌴	𔌵	𔌶	𔌷	𔌸	𔌹	𔌺	𔌻	𔌼	𔌽	𔌾	𔌿
U+1434x	𔍀	𔍁	𔍂	𔍃	𔍄	𔍅	𔍆	𔍇	𔍈	𔍉	𔍊	𔍋	𔍌	𔍍	𔍎	𔍏
U+1435x	𔍐	𔍑	𔍒	𔍓	𔍔	𔍕	𔍖	𔍗	𔍘	𔍙	𔍚	𔍛	𔍜	𔍝	𔍞	𔍟
U+1436x	𔍠	𔍡	𔍢	𔍣	𔍤	𔍥	𔍦	𔍧	𔍨	𔍩	𔍪	𔍫	𔍬	𔍭	𔍮	𔍯
U+1437x	𔍰	𔍱	𔍲	𔍳	𔍴	𔍵	𔍶	𔍷	𔍸	𔍹	𔍺	𔍻	𔍼	𔍽	𔍾	𔍿
U+1438x	𔎀	𔎁	𔎂	𔎃	𔎄	𔎅	𔎆	𔎇	𔎈	𔎉	𔎊	𔎋	𔎌	𔎍	𔎎	𔎏
U+1439x	𔎐	𔎑	𔎒	𔎓	𔎔	𔎕	𔎖	𔎗	𔎘	𔎙	𔎚	𔎛	𔎜	𔎝	𔎞	𔎟
U+143Ax	𔎠	𔎡	𔎢	𔎣	𔎤	𔎥	𔎦	𔎧	𔎨	𔎩	𔎪	𔎫	𔎬	𔎭	𔎮	𔎯
U+143Bx	𔎰	𔎱	𔎲	𔎳	𔎴	𔎵	𔎶	𔎷	𔎸	𔎹	𔎺	𔎻	𔎼	𔎽	𔎾	𔎿
U+143Cx	𔏀	𔏁	𔏂	𔏃	𔏄	𔏅	𔏆	𔏇	𔏈	𔏉	𔏊	𔏋	𔏌	𔏍	𔏎	𔏏
U+143Dx	𔏐	𔏑	𔏒	𔏓	𔏔	𔏕	𔏖	𔏗	𔏘	𔏙	𔏚	𔏛	𔏜	𔏝	𔏞	𔏟
U+143Ex	𔏠	𔏡	𔏢	𔏣	𔏤	𔏥	𔏦	𔏧	𔏨	𔏩	𔏪	𔏫	𔏬	𔏭	𔏮	𔏯
U+143Fx	𔏰	𔏱	𔏲	𔏳	𔏴	𔏵	𔏶	𔏷	𔏸	𔏹	𔏺					
Notes: 1. As of Unicode version 17.0; 2. Grey areas indicate non-assigned code points

== Standardized variants ==
The Egyptian Hieroglyphs Extended-A block has 9 variation sequences defined for standardized variants. (Rotation is clockwise when the text is rendered from left-to-right but counter-clockwise if the text is mirrored right-to-left.)

- Variation selector-1 (VS1) (U+FE00) can be used to rotate 4 signs by 90°:
  U+13BE8–13BEA and 13F72
- VS2 (U+FE01) can be used to rotate 2 signs by 180°:
  U+13F1F and 14274
- VS3 (U+FE02) can be used to rotate 1 sign by 270°:
  U+14274
- VS6 (U+FE05) can be used to rotate 1 sign by approximately 250°:
  U+14274
- VS7 (U+FE06) can be used to rotate 1 sign by approximately 340°:
  U+14274

Rotational variants
Code point	0°	90° U+FE00	180° U+FE01	~250° U+FE05	270° U+FE02	~340° U+FE06
U+13BE8	𓯨	𓯨︀				
U+13BE9	𓯩	𓯩︀				
U+13BEA	𓯪	𓯪︀				
U+13F1F	𓼟		𓼟︁			
U+13F72	𓽲	𓽲︀				
U+14274	𔉴		𔉴︁	𔉴︅	𔉴︂	𔉴︆

== History ==
The following Unicode-related documents record the purpose and process of defining specific characters in the Egyptian Hieroglyphs Extended-A block:

Version	Final code points (Note: Proposed code points and characters names may differ from final code points and names)	Count	L2 ID	WG2 ID	Document
16.0	U+13460..143FA	3,995	L2/16-257	N4751	Suignard, Michel (2016-09-19), Source analysis of an extended Egyptian Hieroglyphs repertoire (Hieroglyphica based)
16.0	U+13460..143FA	3,995	L2/17-073 (proposal, sign_db)	N4788 (proposal, sign_db)	Suignard, Michel (2017-03-19), New draft for the encoding of an extended Egyptian Hieroglyphs repertoire (Hieroglyphica based)
16.0	U+13460..143FA	3,995	L2/17-415 (proposal, sign_db)	N4924 (proposal, sign_db)	Suignard, Michel (2017-11-27), Revised draft for the encoding of an extended Egyptian Hieroglyphs repertoire
16.0	U+13460..143FA	3,995	L2/18-039		Anderson, Deborah; Whistler, Ken; Pournader, Roozbeh; Moore, Lisa; Liang, Hai; Cook, Richard (2018-01-19), "5. Egyptian Hieroglyphs", Recommendations to UTC #154 January 2018 on Script Proposals
16.0	U+13460..143FA	3,995	L2/18-165	N4944	Suignard, Michel (2018-04-17), Revised draft for the encoding of an extended Egyptian Hieroglyphs repertoire (Hieroglyphica based)
16.0	U+13460..143FA	3,995	L2/19-052R	N5019R	Suignard, Michel (2019-02-09), Revised draft for the encoding of an extended Egyptian Hieroglyphs repertoire / First Tranche: Human, God and Goddess
16.0	U+13460..143FA	3,995	L2/19-220	N5063	Suignard, Michel (2019-05-21), Revised draft for the encoding of an extended Egyptian Hieroglyphs repertoire / First Tranche: Human, God and Goddess / Second Tranche: Human parts, Mammals, Mammal parts
16.0	U+13460..143FA	3,995	L2/19-286		Anderson, Deborah; Whistler, Ken; Pournader, Roozbeh; Moore, Lisa; Liang, Hai (2019-07-22), "4. Egyptian Hieroglyphs", Recommendations to UTC #160 July 2019 on Script Proposals
16.0	U+13460..143FA	3,995	L2/20-068R (pdf, appendix)		Suignard, Michel (2020-03-12), Revised draft for the encoding of an extended Egyptian Hieroglyphs repertoire, all Groups (A to Z and AA)
16.0	U+13460..143FA	3,995	L2/20-105		Anderson, Deborah; Whistler, Ken; Pournader, Roozbeh; Moore, Lisa; Constable, Peter; Liang, Hai (2020-04-20), "2. Egyptian Hieroglyphs", Recommendations to UTC #163 April 2020 on Script Proposals
16.0	U+13460..143FA	3,995	L2/21-009		Moore, Lisa (2021-01-27), "8 Egyptian Hieroglyphs", UTC #166 Minutes
16.0	U+13460..143FA	3,995	L2/21-108	N5163	Suignard, Michel (2021-06-14), Consideration for the encoding of an extended Egyptian Hieroglyphs repertoire
16.0	U+13460..143FA	3,995	L2/21-130		Anderson, Deborah; Whistler, Ken; Pournader, Roozbeh; Liang, Hai (2021-07-26), "5 Egyptian Hieroglyphs", Recommendations to UTC #168 July 2021 on Script Proposals
16.0	U+13460..143FA	3,995	L2/23-109 (proposal, sign_db)	N5215 (proposal, sign_db)	Suignard, Michel; Anderson, Deborah; Dils, Peter; Grotenhuis, Jorke; Gülden, Svenja; Nederhof, Mark-Jan; Polis, Stéphane; Richmond, Robert; Rosmorduc, Serge; Werning, Daniel (2023-04-18), Draft encoding proposal for an extended Egyptian Hieroglyphs repertoire
16.0	U+13460..143FA	3,995	L2/23-083		Anderson, Deborah; Kučera, Jan; Whistler, Ken; Pournader, Roozbeh; Constable, Peter (2023-04-21), "11 Egyptian Hieroglyphs", Recommendations to UTC #175 April 2023 on Script Proposals
16.0	U+13460..143FA	3,995	L2/23-164		Anderson, Deborah; Kučera, Jan; Whistler, Ken; Pournader, Roozbeh; Constable, Peter (2023-07-21), "1 Egyptian Hieroglyphs", Recommendations to UTC #176 July 2023 on Script Proposals
16.0	U+13460..143FA	3,995	L2/23-157		Constable, Peter (2023-07-31), "D.1 Section 1: Egyptian Hieroglyphs", UTC #176 Minutes
16.0	U+13460..143FA	3,995	L2/23-238R		Anderson, Deborah; Kučera, Jan; Whistler, Ken; Pournader, Roozbeh; Constable, Peter (2023-11-01), "1 Egyptian Hieroglyphs", Recommendations to UTC #177 November 2023 on Script Proposals
16.0	U+13460..143FA	3,995	L2/23-181R2	N5240R2 (proposal, sign_db)	Suignard, Michel (2023-12-29), Encoding proposal for an extended Egyptian Hieroglyphs repertoire
16.0	U+13460..143FA	3,995	L2/24-013R		Anderson, Deborah; Goregaokar, Manish; Kučera, Jan; Whistler, Ken; Pournader, Roozbeh; Constable, Peter (2024-01-22), "2. Egyptian Hieroglyphs", Recommendations to UTC #178 January 2024 on Script Proposals
16.0	U+13460..143FA	3,995	L2/24-006		Constable, Peter (2024-01-31), "Section 2", UTC #178 Minutes
16.0	U+13460..143FA	3,995	L2/24-238		Werning, Daniel A.; et al. (2024-10-10), Additional Variation Selectors for Rotations of Ancient Egyptian Hieroglyphic Texts [Affects U+13BE8-13BEA, 13F1F, 13F72, and 14274]
16.0	U+13460..143FA	3,995	L2/24-228		Kučera, Jan; et al. (2024-11-01), "5.1 [Affects U+13BE8-13BEA, 13F1F, 13F72, and 14274]", Recommendations to UTC #181 (November 2024) on Script Proposals
16.0	U+13460..143FA	3,995	L2/24-221		Constable, Peter (2024-11-12), "Consensus 181-C46 [Affects U+13BE8-13BEA, 13F1F, 13F72, and 14274]", UTC #181 Minutes, "Accept the variation sequences for Egyptian hieroglyph rotations"

== See also ==
- Egyptian Hieroglyphs (Unicode block)
- Egyptian Hieroglyph Format Controls
- List of Egyptian hieroglyphs
