= Egyptian Hieroglyph Format Controls =

Unicode block

- Range: U+13430..U+1345F (48 code points)
- Plane: SMP
- Scripts: Egyptian Hieroglyphs
- Assigned: 38 code points
- Unused: 10 reserved code points

Unicode Version History
- 12.0 (2019): 9 (+9)
- 15.0 (2022): 38 (+29)

Unicode documentation
- Code chart ∣ Web page
- Note: The block range was expanded from U+13430..1343F to U+13430..1345F with version 15.0.

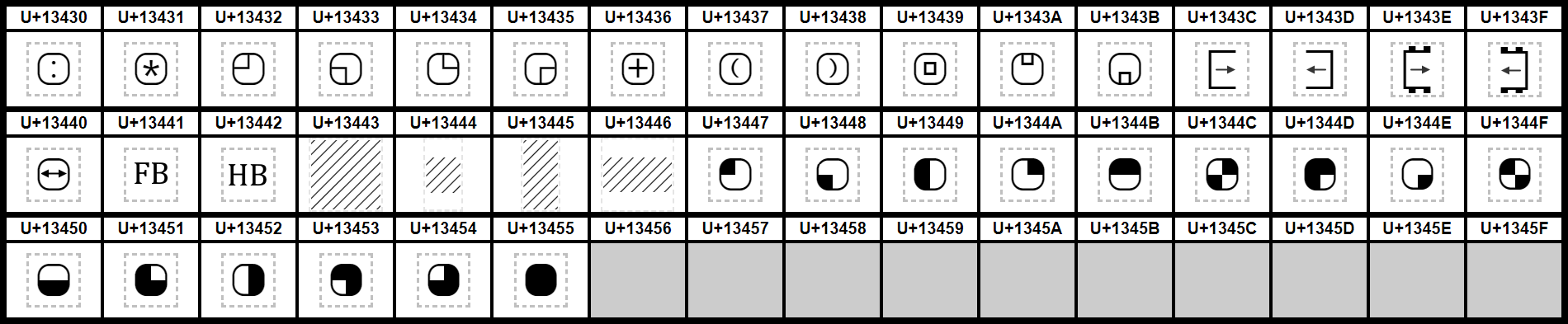
Graphical representation of the Egyptian Hieroglyph Format Controls Unicode block

Egyptian Hieroglyph Format Controls is a Unicode block containing formatting characters that enable full formatting of quadrats for Egyptian hieroglyphs.

The block size was expanded by 32 code points in Unicode version 15.0 (version 14: 1343F → version 15: 1345F), and 29 more characters were defined.

== Block ==
Egyptian Hieroglyph Format Controls^{[1]}^{[2]} Official Unicode Consortium code chart (PDF)
	0	1	2	3	4	5	6	7	8	9	A	B	C	D	E	F
U+1343x	𓐰	𓐱	𓐲	𓐳	𓐴	𓐵	𓐶	𓐷	𓐸	𓐹	𓐺	𓐻	𓐼	𓐽	𓐾	𓐿
U+1344x	𓑀	FB	HB	𓑃	𓑄	𓑅	𓑆	𓑇	𓑈	𓑉	𓑊	𓑋	𓑌	𓑍	𓑎	𓑏
U+1345x	𓑐	𓑑	𓑒	𓑓	𓑔	𓑕										
Notes 1.As of Unicode version 17.0 2.Grey areas indicate non-assigned code points

The Egyptian Hieroglyph Format Controls block has four variation sequences defined for standardized variants.

Variation selector-1 (VS1) (U+FE00) can be used to expand "lost" sign shading to achieve 'continuous shading' for the following characters:

- U+13443 𓑃 EGYPTIAN HIEROGLYPH LOST SIGN
- U+13444 𓑄 EGYPTIAN HIEROGLYPH HALF LOST SIGN
- U+13445 𓑅 EGYPTIAN HIEROGLYPH TALL LOST SIGN
- U+13446 𓑆 EGYPTIAN HIEROGLYPH WIDE LOST SIGN

== History ==
The following Unicode-related documents record the purpose and process of defining specific characters in the Egyptian Hieroglyph Format Controls block:

Version	Final code points (Note: Proposed code points and characters names may differ from final code points and names)	Count	L2 ID	WG2 ID	Document
12.0	U+13430..13438	9	L2/99-008	N1944	Everson, Michael (1999-01-09), Encoding Egyptian Hieroglyphs in Plane 1 of the UCS
12.0	U+13430..13438	9	L2/00-010	N2103	Umamaheswaran, V. S. (2000-01-05), "10.1", Minutes of WG 2 meeting 37, Copenhagen, Denmark: 1999-09-13—16
12.0	U+13430..13438	9	L2/15-069		Richmond, Bob (2015-02-03), Egyptian Hieroglyphs in Unicode plain text, a note on a suggested approach
12.0	U+13430..13438	9	L2/15-149		Anderson, Deborah; Whistler, Ken; McGowan, Rick; Pournader, Roozbeh; Pandey, Anshuman; Glass, Andrew (2015-05-03), "14. Egyptian", Recommendations to UTC #143 May 2015 on Script Proposals
12.0	U+13430..13438	9	L2/15-123		Richmond, Bob (2015-05-04), Proposal to encode three control characters for Egyptian Hieroglyphs
12.0	U+13430..13438	9	L2/16-037		Anderson, Deborah; Whistler, Ken; McGowan, Rick; Pournader, Roozbeh; Glass, Andrew; Iancu, Laurențiu (2016-01-22), "14. Egyptian Hieroglyphs", Recommendations to UTC #146 January 2016 on Script Proposals
12.0	U+13430..13438	9	L2/16-018		Richmond, Bob; Glass, Andrew (2016-01-26), Proposal to encode three control characters for Egyptian Hieroglyphs
12.0	U+13430..13438	9	L2/16-004		Moore, Lisa (2016-02-01), "C.9.1", UTC #146 Minutes
12.0	U+13430..13438	9	L2/16-090		Nederhof, Mark-Jan; Rajan, Vinodh (2016-04-18), Comments on three control characters for Egyptian Hieroglyphs
12.0	U+13430..13438	9	L2/16-104		Richmond, Bob (2016-05-02), Observations: L2/16-090
12.0	U+13430..13438	9	L2/16-156		Anderson, Deborah; Whistler, Ken; Pournader, Roozbeh; Glass, Andrew; Iancu, Laurențiu (2016-05-06), "4. Egyptian hieroglyphs", Recommendations to UTC #147 May 2016 on Script Proposals
12.0	U+13430..13438	9	L2/16-177		Nederhof, Mark-Jan; et al. (2016-06-30), A comprehensive system of control characters for Ancient Egyptian hieroglyphic text (preliminary version)
12.0	U+13430..13438	9	L2/16-199		Overington, William (2016-07-05), A suggestion ... for Ancient Egyptian
12.0	U+13430..13438	9	L2/16-212		Overington, William (2016-07-26), A comment about the encoding of control characters for Ancient Egyptian hieroglyphic text
12.0	U+13430..13438	9	L2/16-216		Anderson, Deborah; Whistler, Ken; McGowan, Rick; Pournader, Roozbeh; Glass, Andrew; Iancu, Laurențiu; Moore, Lisa (2016-07-30), "3. Egyptian hieroglyphs", Recommendations to UTC #148 August 2016 on Script Proposals
12.0	U+13430..13438	9	L2/16-214		Richmond, Bob (2016-08-01), An Extension to the three control characters for Egyptian Hieroglyphs and some additional remarks
12.0	U+13430..13438	9	L2/16-218		Anderson, Deborah (2016-08-01), Brief Report from Cambridge meeting of Egyptologists and Update
12.0	U+13430..13438	9	L2/16-227		Richmond, Bob (2016-08-04), The Universal Hieroglyphic Writing System: Consensus and possible compromise
12.0	U+13430..13438	9	L2/16-231		Rosmorduc, Serge; et al. (2016-08-04), Proposal for Ancient Egyptian encoding in Unicode
12.0	U+13430..13438	9	L2/16-232		Glass, Andrew (2016-08-05), Preliminary analysis of Egyptian Hieroglyph quadrat types
12.0	U+13430..13438	9	L2/16-233		Nederhof, Mark-Jan; et al. (2016-08-05), Addendum to: A system of control characters for Ancient Egyptian hieroglyphic text
12.0	U+13430..13438	9	L2/16-203		Moore, Lisa (2016-08-18), "B.1.3 and C.7", UTC #148 Minutes
12.0	U+13430..13438	9		N4873R (pdf, doc)	"M65.04d", Unconfirmed minutes of WG 2 meeting 65, 2018-03-16
12.0	U+13430..13438	9	L2/16-210		Nederhof, Mark-Jan; et al. (2017-01-25), A system of control characters for Ancient Egyptian hieroglyphic text
12.0	U+13430..13438	9	L2/17-112R	N4818	Glass, Andrew; et al. (2017-05-12), A method for encoding Egyptian quadrats in Unicode
12.0	U+13430..13438	9	L2/17-153		Anderson, Deborah (2017-05-17), "2. Egyptian hieroglyphs – Quadrats", Recommendations to UTC #151 May 2017 on Script Proposals
12.0	U+13430..13438	9	L2/17-103		Moore, Lisa (2017-05-18), "C.7.2", UTC #151 Minutes
12.0	U+13430..13438	9	L2/17-222		Moore, Lisa (2017-08-11), "C.24", UTC #152 Minutes
12.0	U+13430..13438	9		N4953 (pdf, doc)	"M66.07g, h, and k", Unconfirmed minutes of WG 2 meeting 66, 2018-03-23
12.0	U+13430..13438	9	L2/17-353		Anderson, Deborah; Whistler, Ken (2017-10-02), "I. Changes to Egyptian Hieroglyphs Format Controls", WG2 Consent Docket
12.0	U+13430..13438	9	L2/18-036	N4926	Everson, Michael; Glass, Andrew (2018-01-18), Glyphs for Egyptian Hieroglyphic control characters
12.0	U+13430..13438	9	L2/17-362		Moore, Lisa (2018-02-02), "Consensus 153-C9 and 153-C10", UTC #153 Minutes
12.0	U+13430..13438	9	L2/18-115		Moore, Lisa (2018-05-09), "Action item 154-A100", UTC #155 Minutes, "Create new glyphs for U+13432..U+13435 based on L2/18-036 and discussion in the meeting."
12.0	U+13430..13438	9	L2/18-236		Nederhof, Mark-Jan (2018-06-13), A note on the syntax of Ancient Egyptian hieroglyphic control characters
12.0	U+13430..13438	9		N5001	Glass, Andrew (2018-06-19), Comments on names for Egyptian Hieroglyph control characters in PDAM 2.3
12.0	U+13430..13438	9	L2/18-241		Anderson, Deborah; et al. (2018-07-20), "3. Egyptian Hieroglyphs", Recommendations to UTC # 156 July 2018 on Script Proposals
12.0	U+13430..13438	9	L2/18-183		Moore, Lisa (2018-11-20), "Consensus B.1.1.4 and C.9.2", UTC #156 Minutes
12.0	U+13430..13438	9		N5020 (pdf, doc)	Umamaheswaran, V. S. (2019-01-11), "9.3.1", Unconfirmed minutes of WG 2 meeting 67
15.0	U+13439..13455	29	L2/21-208		Glass, Andrew; Grotenhuis, Jorke; Nederhof, Mark-Jan; Polis, Stéphane; Rosmorduc, Serge; Werning, Daniel A. (2021-08-11), Additional control characters for Ancient Egyptian hieroglyphic texts
15.0	U+13439..13455	29	L2/21-174		Anderson, Deborah; Whistler, Ken; Pournader, Roozbeh; Liang, Hai (2021-10-01), "2a. Format Control Characters", Recommendations to UTC #169 October 2021 on Script Proposals
15.0	U+13439..13455	29	L2/21-248		Glass, Andrew; Grotenhuis, Jorke; Nederhof, Mark-Jan; Polis, Stéphane; Rosmorduc, Serge; Werning, Daniel A. (2021-12-22), Additional control characters for Ancient Egyptian hieroglyphic texts
15.0	U+13439..13455	29	L2/22-023		Anderson, Deborah; Whistler, Ken; Pournader, Roozbeh; Constable, Peter (2022-01-22), "4. Egyptian Hieroglyphs", Recommendations to UTC #170 January 2022 on Script Proposals
15.0	U+13439..13455	29	L2/22-016		Constable, Peter (2022-04-21), "D.1 4a Format Control Characters and D.1 4b Variation Sequences for Egyptian Hieroglyphs", UTC #170 Minutes
15.0	U+13439..13455	29	L2/22-068		Anderson, Deborah; Whistler, Ken; Pournader, Roozbeh; Constable, Peter (2022-04-15), "16. Egyptian Hieroglyphs", Recommendations to UTC #171 April 2022 on Script Proposals
15.0	U+13439..13455	29	L2/22-061		Constable, Peter (2022-07-27), "D.1 Section 16 Egyptian Hieroglyphs", Approved Minutes of UTC Meeting 171

== See also ==
- Egyptian Hieroglyphs (Unicode block)
- Egyptian Hieroglyphs Extended-A (Unicode block)
