= Egyptian Hieroglyphs (Unicode block) =

- Range: U+13000..U+1342F (1,072 code points)
- Plane: SMP
- Scripts: Egyptian Hieroglyphs
- Assigned: 1,072 code points
- Unused: 0 reserved code points

Unicode version history
- 5.2 (2009): 1,071 (+1,071)
- 15.0 (2022): 1,072 (+1)

Unicode documentation
- Code chart ∣ Web page

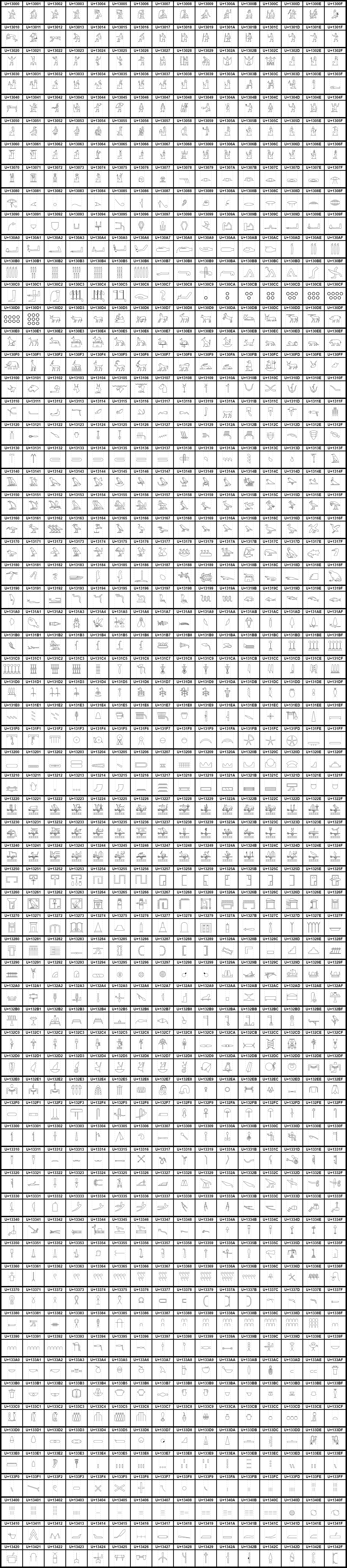
Graphical representation of the Egyptian Hieroglyphs Unicode block

Egyptian Hieroglyphs is a Unicode block containing the Gardiner's sign list of Egyptian hieroglyphs.

== Block ==
Egyptian Hieroglyphs^{[1]} Official Unicode Consortium code chart (PDF)
	0	1	2	3	4	5	6	7	8	9	A	B	C	D	E	F
U+1300x	𓀀	𓀁	𓀂	𓀃	𓀄	𓀅	𓀆	𓀇	𓀈	𓀉	𓀊	𓀋	𓀌	𓀍	𓀎	𓀏
U+1301x	𓀐	𓀑	𓀒	𓀓	𓀔	𓀕	𓀖	𓀗	𓀘	𓀙	𓀚	𓀛	𓀜	𓀝	𓀞	𓀟
U+1302x	𓀠	𓀡	𓀢	𓀣	𓀤	𓀥	𓀦	𓀧	𓀨	𓀩	𓀪	𓀫	𓀬	𓀭	𓀮	𓀯
U+1303x	𓀰	𓀱	𓀲	𓀳	𓀴	𓀵	𓀶	𓀷	𓀸	𓀹	𓀺	𓀻	𓀼	𓀽	𓀾	𓀿
U+1304x	𓁀	𓁁	𓁂	𓁃	𓁄	𓁅	𓁆	𓁇	𓁈	𓁉	𓁊	𓁋	𓁌	𓁍	𓁎	𓁏
U+1305x	𓁐	𓁑	𓁒	𓁓	𓁔	𓁕	𓁖	𓁗	𓁘	𓁙	𓁚	𓁛	𓁜	𓁝	𓁞	𓁟
U+1306x	𓁠	𓁡	𓁢	𓁣	𓁤	𓁥	𓁦	𓁧	𓁨	𓁩	𓁪	𓁫	𓁬	𓁭	𓁮	𓁯
U+1307x	𓁰	𓁱	𓁲	𓁳	𓁴	𓁵	𓁶	𓁷	𓁸	𓁹	𓁺	𓁻	𓁼	𓁽	𓁾	𓁿
U+1308x	𓂀	𓂁	𓂂	𓂃	𓂄	𓂅	𓂆	𓂇	𓂈	𓂉	𓂊	𓂋	𓂌	𓂍	𓂎	𓂏
U+1309x	𓂐	𓂑	𓂒	𓂓	𓂔	𓂕	𓂖	𓂗	𓂘	𓂙	𓂚	𓂛	𓂜	𓂝	𓂞	𓂟
U+130Ax	𓂠	𓂡	𓂢	𓂣	𓂤	𓂥	𓂦	𓂧	𓂨	𓂩	𓂪	𓂫	𓂬	𓂭	𓂮	𓂯
U+130Bx	𓂰	𓂱	𓂲	𓂳	𓂴	𓂵	𓂶	𓂷	𓂸	𓂹	𓂺	𓂻	𓂼	𓂽	𓂾	𓂿
U+130Cx	𓃀	𓃁	𓃂	𓃃	𓃄	𓃅	𓃆	𓃇	𓃈	𓃉	𓃊	𓃋	𓃌	𓃍	𓃎	𓃏
U+130Dx	𓃐	𓃑	𓃒	𓃓	𓃔	𓃕	𓃖	𓃗	𓃘	𓃙	𓃚	𓃛	𓃜	𓃝	𓃞	𓃟
U+130Ex	𓃠	𓃡	𓃢	𓃣	𓃤	𓃥	𓃦	𓃧	𓃨	𓃩	𓃪	𓃫	𓃬	𓃭	𓃮	𓃯
U+130Fx	𓃰	𓃱	𓃲	𓃳	𓃴	𓃵	𓃶	𓃷	𓃸	𓃹	𓃺	𓃻	𓃼	𓃽	𓃾	𓃿
U+1310x	𓄀	𓄁	𓄂	𓄃	𓄄	𓄅	𓄆	𓄇	𓄈	𓄉	𓄊	𓄋	𓄌	𓄍	𓄎	𓄏
U+1311x	𓄐	𓄑	𓄒	𓄓	𓄔	𓄕	𓄖	𓄗	𓄘	𓄙	𓄚	𓄛	𓄜	𓄝	𓄞	𓄟
U+1312x	𓄠	𓄡	𓄢	𓄣	𓄤	𓄥	𓄦	𓄧	𓄨	𓄩	𓄪	𓄫	𓄬	𓄭	𓄮	𓄯
U+1313x	𓄰	𓄱	𓄲	𓄳	𓄴	𓄵	𓄶	𓄷	𓄸	𓄹	𓄺	𓄻	𓄼	𓄽	𓄾	𓄿
U+1314x	𓅀	𓅁	𓅂	𓅃	𓅄	𓅅	𓅆	𓅇	𓅈	𓅉	𓅊	𓅋	𓅌	𓅍	𓅎	𓅏
U+1315x	𓅐	𓅑	𓅒	𓅓	𓅔	𓅕	𓅖	𓅗	𓅘	𓅙	𓅚	𓅛	𓅜	𓅝	𓅞	𓅟
U+1316x	𓅠	𓅡	𓅢	𓅣	𓅤	𓅥	𓅦	𓅧	𓅨	𓅩	𓅪	𓅫	𓅬	𓅭	𓅮	𓅯
U+1317x	𓅰	𓅱	𓅲	𓅳	𓅴	𓅵	𓅶	𓅷	𓅸	𓅹	𓅺	𓅻	𓅼	𓅽	𓅾	𓅿
U+1318x	𓆀	𓆁	𓆂	𓆃	𓆄	𓆅	𓆆	𓆇	𓆈	𓆉	𓆊	𓆋	𓆌	𓆍	𓆎	𓆏
U+1319x	𓆐	𓆑	𓆒	𓆓	𓆔	𓆕	𓆖	𓆗	𓆘	𓆙	𓆚	𓆛	𓆜	𓆝	𓆞	𓆟
U+131Ax	𓆠	𓆡	𓆢	𓆣	𓆤	𓆥	𓆦	𓆧	𓆨	𓆩	𓆪	𓆫	𓆬	𓆭	𓆮	𓆯
U+131Bx	𓆰	𓆱	𓆲	𓆳	𓆴	𓆵	𓆶	𓆷	𓆸	𓆹	𓆺	𓆻	𓆼	𓆽	𓆾	𓆿
U+131Cx	𓇀	𓇁	𓇂	𓇃	𓇄	𓇅	𓇆	𓇇	𓇈	𓇉	𓇊	𓇋	𓇌	𓇍	𓇎	𓇏
U+131Dx	𓇐	𓇑	𓇒	𓇓	𓇔	𓇕	𓇖	𓇗	𓇘	𓇙	𓇚	𓇛	𓇜	𓇝	𓇞	𓇟
U+131Ex	𓇠	𓇡	𓇢	𓇣	𓇤	𓇥	𓇦	𓇧	𓇨	𓇩	𓇪	𓇫	𓇬	𓇭	𓇮	𓇯
U+131Fx	𓇰	𓇱	𓇲	𓇳	𓇴	𓇵	𓇶	𓇷	𓇸	𓇹	𓇺	𓇻	𓇼	𓇽	𓇾	𓇿
U+1320x	𓈀	𓈁	𓈂	𓈃	𓈄	𓈅	𓈆	𓈇	𓈈	𓈉	𓈊	𓈋	𓈌	𓈍	𓈎	𓈏
U+1321x	𓈐	𓈑	𓈒	𓈓	𓈔	𓈕	𓈖	𓈗	𓈘	𓈙	𓈚	𓈛	𓈜	𓈝	𓈞	𓈟
U+1322x	𓈠	𓈡	𓈢	𓈣	𓈤	𓈥	𓈦	𓈧	𓈨	𓈩	𓈪	𓈫	𓈬	𓈭	𓈮	𓈯
U+1323x	𓈰	𓈱	𓈲	𓈳	𓈴	𓈵	𓈶	𓈷	𓈸	𓈹	𓈺	𓈻	𓈼	𓈽	𓈾	𓈿
U+1324x	𓉀	𓉁	𓉂	𓉃	𓉄	𓉅	𓉆	𓉇	𓉈	𓉉	𓉊	𓉋	𓉌	𓉍	𓉎	𓉏
U+1325x	𓉐	𓉑	𓉒	𓉓	𓉔	𓉕	𓉖	𓉗	𓉘	𓉙	𓉚	𓉛	𓉜	𓉝	𓉞	𓉟
U+1326x	𓉠	𓉡	𓉢	𓉣	𓉤	𓉥	𓉦	𓉧	𓉨	𓉩	𓉪	𓉫	𓉬	𓉭	𓉮	𓉯
U+1327x	𓉰	𓉱	𓉲	𓉳	𓉴	𓉵	𓉶	𓉷	𓉸	𓉹	𓉺	𓉻	𓉼	𓉽	𓉾	𓉿
U+1328x	𓊀	𓊁	𓊂	𓊃	𓊄	𓊅	𓊆	𓊇	𓊈	𓊉	𓊊	𓊋	𓊌	𓊍	𓊎	𓊏
U+1329x	𓊐	𓊑	𓊒	𓊓	𓊔	𓊕	𓊖	𓊗	𓊘	𓊙	𓊚	𓊛	𓊜	𓊝	𓊞	𓊟
U+132Ax	𓊠	𓊡	𓊢	𓊣	𓊤	𓊥	𓊦	𓊧	𓊨	𓊩	𓊪	𓊫	𓊬	𓊭	𓊮	𓊯
U+132Bx	𓊰	𓊱	𓊲	𓊳	𓊴	𓊵	𓊶	𓊷	𓊸	𓊹	𓊺	𓊻	𓊼	𓊽	𓊾	𓊿
U+132Cx	𓋀	𓋁	𓋂	𓋃	𓋄	𓋅	𓋆	𓋇	𓋈	𓋉	𓋊	𓋋	𓋌	𓋍	𓋎	𓋏
U+132Dx	𓋐	𓋑	𓋒	𓋓	𓋔	𓋕	𓋖	𓋗	𓋘	𓋙	𓋚	𓋛	𓋜	𓋝	𓋞	𓋟
U+132Ex	𓋠	𓋡	𓋢	𓋣	𓋤	𓋥	𓋦	𓋧	𓋨	𓋩	𓋪	𓋫	𓋬	𓋭	𓋮	𓋯
U+132Fx	𓋰	𓋱	𓋲	𓋳	𓋴	𓋵	𓋶	𓋷	𓋸	𓋹	𓋺	𓋻	𓋼	𓋽	𓋾	𓋿
U+1330x	𓌀	𓌁	𓌂	𓌃	𓌄	𓌅	𓌆	𓌇	𓌈	𓌉	𓌊	𓌋	𓌌	𓌍	𓌎	𓌏
U+1331x	𓌐	𓌑	𓌒	𓌓	𓌔	𓌕	𓌖	𓌗	𓌘	𓌙	𓌚	𓌛	𓌜	𓌝	𓌞	𓌟
U+1332x	𓌠	𓌡	𓌢	𓌣	𓌤	𓌥	𓌦	𓌧	𓌨	𓌩	𓌪	𓌫	𓌬	𓌭	𓌮	𓌯
U+1333x	𓌰	𓌱	𓌲	𓌳	𓌴	𓌵	𓌶	𓌷	𓌸	𓌹	𓌺	𓌻	𓌼	𓌽	𓌾	𓌿
U+1334x	𓍀	𓍁	𓍂	𓍃	𓍄	𓍅	𓍆	𓍇	𓍈	𓍉	𓍊	𓍋	𓍌	𓍍	𓍎	𓍏
U+1335x	𓍐	𓍑	𓍒	𓍓	𓍔	𓍕	𓍖	𓍗	𓍘	𓍙	𓍚	𓍛	𓍜	𓍝	𓍞	𓍟
U+1336x	𓍠	𓍡	𓍢	𓍣	𓍤	𓍥	𓍦	𓍧	𓍨	𓍩	𓍪	𓍫	𓍬	𓍭	𓍮	𓍯
U+1337x	𓍰	𓍱	𓍲	𓍳	𓍴	𓍵	𓍶	𓍷	𓍸	𓍹	𓍺	𓍻	𓍼	𓍽	𓍾	𓍿
U+1338x	𓎀	𓎁	𓎂	𓎃	𓎄	𓎅	𓎆	𓎇	𓎈	𓎉	𓎊	𓎋	𓎌	𓎍	𓎎	𓎏
U+1339x	𓎐	𓎑	𓎒	𓎓	𓎔	𓎕	𓎖	𓎗	𓎘	𓎙	𓎚	𓎛	𓎜	𓎝	𓎞	𓎟
U+133Ax	𓎠	𓎡	𓎢	𓎣	𓎤	𓎥	𓎦	𓎧	𓎨	𓎩	𓎪	𓎫	𓎬	𓎭	𓎮	𓎯
U+133Bx	𓎰	𓎱	𓎲	𓎳	𓎴	𓎵	𓎶	𓎷	𓎸	𓎹	𓎺	𓎻	𓎼	𓎽	𓎾	𓎿
U+133Cx	𓏀	𓏁	𓏂	𓏃	𓏄	𓏅	𓏆	𓏇	𓏈	𓏉	𓏊	𓏋	𓏌	𓏍	𓏎	𓏏
U+133Dx	𓏐	𓏑	𓏒	𓏓	𓏔	𓏕	𓏖	𓏗	𓏘	𓏙	𓏚	𓏛	𓏜	𓏝	𓏞	𓏟
U+133Ex	𓏠	𓏡	𓏢	𓏣	𓏤	𓏥	𓏦	𓏧	𓏨	𓏩	𓏪	𓏫	𓏬	𓏭	𓏮	𓏯
U+133Fx	𓏰	𓏱	𓏲	𓏳	𓏴	𓏵	𓏶	𓏷	𓏸	𓏹	𓏺	𓏻	𓏼	𓏽	𓏾	𓏿
U+1340x	𓐀	𓐁	𓐂	𓐃	𓐄	𓐅	𓐆	𓐇	𓐈	𓐉	𓐊	𓐋	𓐌	𓐍	𓐎	𓐏
U+1341x	𓐐	𓐑	𓐒	𓐓	𓐔	𓐕	𓐖	𓐗	𓐘	𓐙	𓐚	𓐛	𓐜	𓐝	𓐞	𓐟
U+1342x	𓐠	𓐡	𓐢	𓐣	𓐤	𓐥	𓐦	𓐧	𓐨	𓐩	𓐪	𓐫	𓐬	𓐭	𓐮	𓐯
Notes: 1. As of Unicode version 17.0

== Standardized variants ==
The Egyptian Hieroglyphs Unicode block has 133 standardized variants defined to specify rotated signs. (Rotation is clockwise when the text is rendered from left-to-right but counter-clockwise if the text is mirrored right-to-left.)

- Variation selector-1 (VS1) (U+FE00) can be used to rotate 42 signs by 90°:
  U+13091, 1310F, 1311C, 13121, 13127, 13139, 131A0, 131B1, 131B8–131B9, 131CB, 131E0, 131F9–131FA, 1327B, 1327F, 13285, 1328C, 132AA, 132CB, 132DC, 132E7, 13307, 1331B, 13322, 1333C, 13377–13378, 13399–1339A, 133D3, 133E4–133E5, 133E7, 133EE, 133F2, 133F5–133F6, 13416, 13419–1341A and 13423
- VS2 (U+FE01) can be used to rotate 23 signs by 180°:
  U+13093, 13132, 13139, 13187, 131B1, 131EE, 131F8–131FA, 13257, 1327F, 1328B, 132A4, 13308, 13312–13314, 1331B, 13321–13322, 13331, 133E8 and 13419
- VS3 (U+FE02) can be used to rotate 36 signs by 270°:
  U+13117, 13139, 13183, 131A0, 131BA, 131EE, 13216, 1327B, 132A4, 132E7, 132E9, 132F8, 132FD, 13302–13303, 13310–13314, 1331C, 13321, 13331, 1334A, 13361, 13373, 1337D, 13385, 133AF–133B0, 133BF, 133DB, 133DD, 13419, 1342C and 1342E
- VS4 (U+FE03) can be used to rotate 16 signs by between 15 and 45°:
  U+13012, 130B8, 130BA, 1310F, 1312F, 13139, 13184, 1319C–1319D, 1319F, 131B1, 131DB, 13205, 13296, 13338 and 13419
- VS5 (U+FE04) can be used to rotate 2 signs by approximately 135°:
  U+13139 and 1340D
- VS6 (U+FE05) can be used to rotate 1 sign by approximately 225°:
  U+13139
- VS7 (U+FE06) can be used to rotate 13 signs by between 300 and 345°:
  U+1312F, 13139, 13184, 131DB, 131EE, 13205, 132A4, 132E9, 1332B, 13338, 13370–13371 and 13419

Rotational variants
Code point	0°	~15–45° U+FE03	90° U+FE00	~135° U+FE04	180° U+FE01	~225° U+FE05	270° U+FE02	~300–345° U+FE06
U+13012	𓀒	𓀒︃						
U+13091	𓂑		𓂑︀					
U+13093	𓂓				𓂓︁			
U+130B8	𓂸	𓂸︃						
U+130BA	𓂺	𓂺︃						
U+1310F	𓄏	𓄏︃	𓄏︀					
U+13117	𓄗						𓄗︂	
U+1311C	𓄜		𓄜︀					
U+13121	𓄡		𓄡︀					
U+13127	𓄧		𓄧︀					
U+1312F	𓄯	𓄯︃						𓄯︆
U+13132	𓄲				𓄲︁			
U+13139	𓄹	𓄹︃	𓄹︀	𓄹︄	𓄹︁	𓄹︅	𓄹︂	𓄹︆
U+13183	𓆃						𓆃︂	
U+13184	𓆄	𓆄︃						𓆄︆
U+13187	𓆇				𓆇︁			
U+1319C	𓆜	𓆜︃						
U+1319D	𓆝	𓆝︃						
U+1319F	𓆟	𓆟︃						
U+131A0	𓆠		𓆠︀				𓆠︂	
U+131B1	𓆱	𓆱︃	𓆱︀		𓆱︁			
U+131B8	𓆸		𓆸︀					
U+131B9	𓆹		𓆹︀					
U+131BA	𓆺						𓆺︂	
U+131CB	𓇋		𓇋︀					
U+131DB	𓇛	𓇛︃						𓇛︆
U+131E0	𓇠		𓇠︀					
U+131EE	𓇮				𓇮︁		𓇮︂	𓇮︆
U+131F8	𓇸				𓇸︁			
U+131F9	𓇹		𓇹︀		𓇹︁			
U+131FA	𓇺		𓇺︀		𓇺︁			
U+13205	𓈅	𓈅︃						𓈅︆
U+13216	𓈖						𓈖︂	
U+13257	𓉗				𓉗︁			
U+1327B	𓉻		𓉻︀				𓉻︂	
U+1327F	𓉿		𓉿︀		𓉿︁			
U+13285	𓊅		𓊅︀					
U+1328B	𓊋				𓊋︁			
U+1328C	𓊌		𓊌︀					
U+13296	𓊖	𓊖︃						
U+132A4	𓊤				𓊤︁		𓊤︂	𓊤︆
U+132AA	𓊪		𓊪︀					
U+132CB	𓋋		𓋋︀					
U+132DC	𓋜		𓋜︀					
U+132E7	𓋧		𓋧︀				𓋧︂	
U+132E9	𓋩						𓋩︂	𓋩︆
U+132F8	𓋸						𓋸︂	
U+132FD	𓋽						𓋽︂	
U+13302	𓌂						𓌂︂	
U+13303	𓌃						𓌃︂	
U+13307	𓌇		𓌇︀					
U+13308	𓌈				𓌈︁			
U+13310	𓌐						𓌐︂	
U+13311	𓌑						𓌑︂	
U+13312	𓌒				𓌒︁		𓌒︂	
U+13313	𓌓				𓌓︁		𓌓︂	
U+13314	𓌔				𓌔︁		𓌔︂	
U+1331B	𓌛		𓌛︀		𓌛︁			
U+1331C	𓌜						𓌜︂	
U+13321	𓌡				𓌡︁		𓌡︂	
U+13322	𓌢		𓌢︀		𓌢︁			
U+1332B	𓌫							𓌫︆
U+13331	𓌱				𓌱︁		𓌱︂	
U+13338	𓌸	𓌸︃						𓌸︆
U+1333C	𓌼		𓌼︀					
U+1334A	𓍊						𓍊︂	
U+13361	𓍡						𓍡︂	
U+13370	𓍰							𓍰︆
U+13371	𓍱							𓍱︆
U+13373	𓍳						𓍳︂	
U+13377	𓍷		𓍷︀					
U+13378	𓍸		𓍸︀					
U+1337D	𓍽						𓍽︂	
U+13385	𓎅						𓎅︂	
U+13399	𓎙		𓎙︀					
U+1339A	𓎚		𓎚︀					
U+133AF	𓎯						𓎯︂	
U+133B0	𓎰						𓎰︂	
U+133BF	𓎿						𓎿︂	
U+133D3	𓏓		𓏓︀					
U+133DB	𓏛						𓏛︂	
U+133DD	𓏝						𓏝︂	
U+133E4	𓏤		𓏤︀					
U+133E5	𓏥		𓏥︀					
U+133E7	𓏧		𓏧︀					
U+133E8	𓏨				𓏨︁			
U+133EE	𓏮		𓏮︀					
U+133F2	𓏲		𓏲︀					
U+133F5	𓏵		𓏵︀					
U+133F6	𓏶		𓏶︀					
U+1340D	𓐍			𓐍︄				
U+13416	𓐖		𓐖︀					
U+13419	𓐙	𓐙︃	𓐙︀		𓐙︁		𓐙︂	𓐙︆
U+1341A	𓐚		𓐚︀					
U+13423	𓐣		𓐣︀					
U+1342C	𓐬						𓐬︂	
U+1342E	𓐮						𓐮︂	

== History ==
The following Unicode-related documents record the purpose and process of defining specific characters in the Egyptian Hieroglyphs block:

Version	Final code points (Note: Proposed code points and characters names may differ from final code points and names)	Count	L2 ID	WG2 ID	Document
5.2	U+13000..1342E	1,071	L2/97-266	N1636	Everson, Michael (1997-08-25), Encoding Egyptian Hieroglyphics, Plane 1
5.2	U+13000..1342E	1,071	L2/97-267	N1637	Everson, Michael (1997-09-18), Proposal to encode Basic Egyptian Hieroglyphics, Plane 1
5.2	U+13000..1342E	1,071	L2/98-070		Aliprand, Joan; Winkler, Arnold, "3.A.4. item a. Egyptian hieroglyphs", Minutes of the joint UTC and L2 meeting from the meeting in Cupertino, February 25-27, 1998
5.2	U+13000..1342E	1,071	L2/98-286	N1703	Umamaheswaran, V. S.; Ksar, Mike (1998-07-02), "8.19", Unconfirmed Meeting Minutes, WG 2 Meeting #34, Redmond, WA, USA; 1998-03-16--20
5.2	U+13000..1342E	1,071	L2/99-008	N1944	Everson, Michael (1999-01-09), Encoding Egyptian Hieroglyphs in Plane 1 of the UCS
5.2	U+13000..1342E	1,071	L2/99-223	N2096, N2025-1	Schenkel, Wolfgang (1999-07-23), Comments on the question of encoding Egyptian hieroglyphs in the UCS
5.2	U+13000..1342E	1,071	L2/00-010	N2103	Umamaheswaran, V. S. (2000-01-05), "10.1", Minutes of WG 2 meeting 37, Copenhagen, Denmark: 1999-09-13—16
5.2	U+13000..1342E	1,071	L2/00-128		Bunz, Carl-Martin (2000-03-01), Scripts from the Past in Future Versions of Unicode
5.2	U+13000..1342E	1,071	L2/00-153		Bunz, Carl-Martin (2000-04-26), Further comments on historic scripts
5.2	U+13000..1342E	1,071	L2/01-184R		Moore, Lisa (2001-06-18), "Consensus 87-C4", Minutes from the UTC/L2 meeting
5.2	U+13000..1342E	1,071	L2/02-290		Hornung, Erik; Green, Lyn (2002-08-05), Two letters of support for encoding Egyptian Hieroglyphics
5.2	U+13000..1342E	1,071	L2/02-281		Snell, Daniel; Hollis, Susan; Johnson, Janet (2002-08-07), Three letters of support for encoding Egyptian Hieroglyphics
5.2	U+13000..1342E	1,071	L2/02-288		Everson, Michael (2002-08-13), Status report on proposal encode Egyptian Hieroglyphs
5.2	U+13000..1342E	1,071	L2/02-295		Rocchi, Federico (2002-08-13), Letter of support for encoding Egyptian Hieroglyphics
5.2	U+13000..1342E	1,071	L2/02-307		Baines, John (2002-08-20), Letter of support for encoding Egyptian Hieroglyphics
5.2	U+13000..1342E	1,071	L2/05-311		Cook, Richard; Everson, Michael; McGowan, Rick; Richmond, Robert (2005-10-24), Revised proposal to encode Egyptian hieroglyphs in Plane 1 of the UCS
5.2	U+13000..1342E	1,071	L2/05-312		Cook, Richard (2005-10-24), Sample of Hieroglyphic mapping data file
5.2	U+13000..1342E	1,071	L2/05-313		Cook, Richard (2005-10-24), Scans from Catalog of the Egyptian Hieroglyphic Printing Type
5.2	U+13000..1342E	1,071	L2/06-354	N3181	Everson, Michael; Richmond, Bob (2006-10-29), Towards a Proposal to encode Egyptian Hieroglyphs in Unicode
5.2	U+13000..1342E	1,071	L2/06-355	N3182	Everson, Michael (2006-10-29), Sources for the encoding of Egyptian Hieroglyphs
5.2	U+13000..1342E	1,071	L2/06-356	N3183	Everson, Michael; Richmond, Bob (2006-10-29), Report on progress made at the Oxford meeting of Egyptologists
5.2	U+13000..1342E	1,071	L2/07-097	N3237	Everson, Michael; et al. (2007-04-10), Proposal to encode Egyptian Hieroglyphs in the SMP of the UCS
5.2	U+13000..1342E	1,071		N3353 (pdf, doc)	Umamaheswaran, V. S. (2007-10-10), "M51.11k - M51.11m", Unconfirmed minutes of WG 2 meeting 51 Hanzhou, China; 2007-04-24/27
5.2	U+13000..1342E	1,071	L2/07-118R2		Moore, Lisa (2007-05-23), "111-C17", UTC #111 Minutes
5.2	U+13000..1342E	1,071	L2/07-268	N3253 (pdf, doc)	Umamaheswaran, V. S. (2007-07-26), "M50.29", Unconfirmed minutes of WG 2 meeting 50, Frankfurt-am-Main, Germany; 2007-04-24/27
5.2	U+13000..1342E	1,071	L2/07-292	N3308	Everson, Michael (2007-08-31), Towards a default deterministic ordering for Egyptian Hieroglyphs
5.2	U+13000..1342E	1,071	L2/07-306	N3310	Aguizy, Ola El (2007-09-04), Letter in Support of N3237 Egyptian Hieroglyphs Proposal
5.2	U+13000..1342E	1,071	L2/07-345		Moore, Lisa (2007-10-25), "Consensus 113-C14", UTC #113 Minutes, "Accept the revised repertoire for Egyptian Hieroglyphs as documented in L2/07-322."
5.2	U+13000..1342E	1,071	L2/15-069		Richmond, Bob (2015-02-03), Egyptian Hieroglyphs in Unicode plain text, a note on a suggested approach
5.2	U+13000..1342E	1,071	L2/15-149		Anderson, Deborah; Whistler, Ken; McGowan, Rick; Pournader, Roozbeh; Pandey, Anshuman; Glass, Andrew (2015-05-03), "14. Egyptian", Recommendations to UTC #143 May 2015 on Script Proposals
5.2	U+13000..1342E	1,071	L2/15-208		Davis, Mark (2015-07-27), Hieroglyphs as emoji?
5.2	U+13000..1342E	1,071	L2/15-209		Davis, Mark (2015-07-27), Egyptian hieroglyphs spreadsheet
5.2	U+13000..1342E	1,071	L2/15-187		Moore, Lisa (2015-08-11), "E.1.9", UTC #144 Minutes
5.2	U+13000..1342E	1,071	L2/21-028		Anderson, Deborah; Suignard, Michel (2021-01-07), Glyph changes to Egyptian Hieroglyphs for Unicode 14.0 with proposed annotations
5.2	U+13000..1342E	1,071	L2/21-016R		Anderson, Deborah; Whistler, Ken; Pournader, Roozbeh; Moore, Lisa; Liang, Hai (2021-01-14), "8a. Glyph changes to Egyptian Hieroglyphs block", Recommendations to UTC #166 January 2021 on Script Proposals
5.2	U+13000..1342E	1,071	L2/21-009		Moore, Lisa (2021-01-27), "B.1 — 8a. Glyph changes to Egyptian Hieroglyphs block", UTC #166 Minutes
5.2	U+13000..1342E	1,071	L2/21-248		Glass, Andrew; Grotenhuis, Jorke; Nederhof, Mark-Jan; Polis, Stéphane; Rosmorduc, Serge; Werning, Daniel A. (2021-12-22), Additional control characters for Ancient Egyptian hieroglyphic texts
5.2	U+13000..1342E	1,071	L2/22-012R		Werning, Daniel A. (2022-04-22), Rotations of Egyptian Hieroglyphs to be Registered in Unicode
5.2	U+13000..1342E	1,071	L2/22-023		Anderson, Deborah; Whistler, Ken; Pournader, Roozbeh; Constable, Peter (2022-01-22), "4b Variation Sequences for Egyptian Hieroglyphs", Recommendations to UTC #170 January 2022 on Script Proposals
5.2	U+13000..1342E	1,071	L2/22-016		Constable, Peter (2022-04-21), "D.1 4b Variation Sequences for Egyptian Hieroglyphs", UTC #170 Minutes
5.2	U+13000..1342E	1,071	L2/23-254		Suignard, Michel (2023-10-19), Standardized Variation Sequences stability [Affects U+13092, 130A9, and 13403]
5.2	U+13000..1342E	1,071	L2/23-231		Constable, Peter (2023-12-08), "Consensus 177-C18", UTC #177 Minutes, "Rescind three Egyptian Hieroglyph variation sequences [Affects U+13092, 130A9, and 13403]"
5.2	U+13000..1342E	1,071	L2/24-175		Dils, Peter; Glass, Andrew; Grotenhuis, Jorke; Gülden, Svenja; Nederhof, Mark-Jan; Polis, Stéphane; Werning, Daniel A. (2024-06-15), Rationale for commenting out the variation sequence U+1333B U+FE00 for Ancient Egyptian
5.2	U+13000..1342E	1,071	L2/24-177		Werning, Daniel A.; Dils, Peter; Grotenhuis, Jorke; Gülden, Svenja; Polis, Stéphane (2024-06-28), Additional Variation Selectors as Substitutes for Legacy v5.2 v15 Hieroglyphs [Affects U+13132, 13139, 131E0, 1327B, 1333B, 133DB, 133E5, 133E7, and 133E8]
5.2	U+13000..1342E	1,071	L2/24-166		Anderson, Deborah; Goregaokar, Manish; Kučera, Jan; Whistler, Ken; Pournader, Roozbeh; Constable, Peter (2024-07-18), "1a Rotations [Affects U+13132, 13139, 131E0, 1327B, 1333B, 133DB, 133E5, 133E7, and 133E8]", Recommendations to UTC #180 July 2024 on Script Proposals
5.2	U+13000..1342E	1,071	L2/24-159		Constable, Peter (2024-07-29), "Section 1a Rotations [Affects U+13132, 13139, 131E0, 1327B, 1333B, 133DB, 133E5, 133E7, and 133E8]", UTC #180 Minutes
5.2	U+13000..1342E	1,071	L2/24-238		Werning, Daniel A.; et al. (2024-10-10), Additional Variation Selectors for Rotations of Ancient Egyptian Hieroglyphic Texts [Affects U+13012, 130B8, 130BA, 1310F, 1312F, 13139, 13184, 1319C-1319F, 131B1, 131DB, 131EE, 13205, 1328B, 13296, 132A4, 132E9, 1332B, 13370, 13371, 133E4, 133EE, 1340D, and 13419]
5.2	U+13000..1342E	1,071	L2/24-228		Kučera, Jan; et al. (2024-11-01), "5.1 [Affects U+13012, 130B8, 130BA, 1310F, 1312F, 13139, 13184, 1319C-1319F, 131B1, 131DB, 131EE, 13205, 1328B, 13296, 132A4, 132E9, 1332B, 13370, 13371, 133E4, 133EE, 1340D, and 13419]", Recommendations to UTC #181 (November 2024) on Script Proposals
5.2	U+13000..1342E	1,071	L2/24-221		Constable, Peter (2024-11-12), "Consensus 181-C46 [Affects U+13012, 130B8, 130BA, 1310F, 1312F, 13139, 13184, 1319C-1319F, 131B1, 131DB, 131EE, 13205, 1328B, 13296, 132A4, 132E9, 1332B, 13370, 13371, 133E4, 133EE, 1340D, and 13419]", UTC #181 Minutes, "Accept the variation sequences for Egyptian hieroglyph rotations"
15.0	U+1342F	1	L2/21-208		Glass, Andrew; Grotenhuis, Jorke; Nederhof, Mark-Jan; Polis, Stéphane; Rosmorduc, Serge; Werning, Daniel A. (2021-08-11), Additional control characters for Ancient Egyptian hieroglyphic texts
15.0	U+1342F	1	L2/21-174		Anderson, Deborah; Whistler, Ken; Pournader, Roozbeh; Liang, Hai (2021-10-01), "2a. Format Control Characters", Recommendations to UTC #169 October 2021 on Script Proposals
15.0	U+1342F	1	L2/21-248		Glass, Andrew; Grotenhuis, Jorke; Nederhof, Mark-Jan; Polis, Stéphane; Rosmorduc, Serge; Werning, Daniel A. (2021-12-22), Additional control characters for Ancient Egyptian hieroglyphic texts
15.0	U+1342F	1	L2/22-023		Anderson, Deborah; Whistler, Ken; Pournader, Roozbeh; Constable, Peter (2022-01-22), "4a. Format Control Characters", Recommendations to UTC #170 January 2022 on Script Proposals
15.0	U+1342F	1	L2/22-016		Constable, Peter (2022-04-21), "D.1 4a Format Control Characters", UTC #170 Minutes

== See also ==
- Egyptian Hieroglyphs Extended-A (Unicode block)
- Egyptian Hieroglyph Format Controls (Unicode block)
- List of Egyptian hieroglyphs
- Egyptian transliteration schemes
