= Branch (hieroglyph) =

Egyptian hieroglyph

M3
Branch
in hieroglyphs

The ancient Egyptian Branch hieroglyph, also called a Stick, is a member of the trees and plants hieroglyphs.

The branch is an Egyptian language biliteral with the value (kh)t, (khet)-(ḫt); it is an ideogram-(determinative), for wood, tree, and the linear measure (=100 cubits). The hieroglyph is described as a branch without leaves.

As the value (kh)t, it is often complemented in a hieroglyphic block with kh–("sieve"), Aa1 and "t"–(bread bun). X1

== Iconographic usage ==
=== Pharaonic usage ===
Pharaoh Nectanebo II used the branch hieroglyph for his Nomen name of Nakhthoreb, "Strong is His Lord, Beloved of Hathor".

Pharaoh Nectanebo I's nomen was Nekhtnebef, "Strong is His Lord."

=== Old Kingdom usage ===
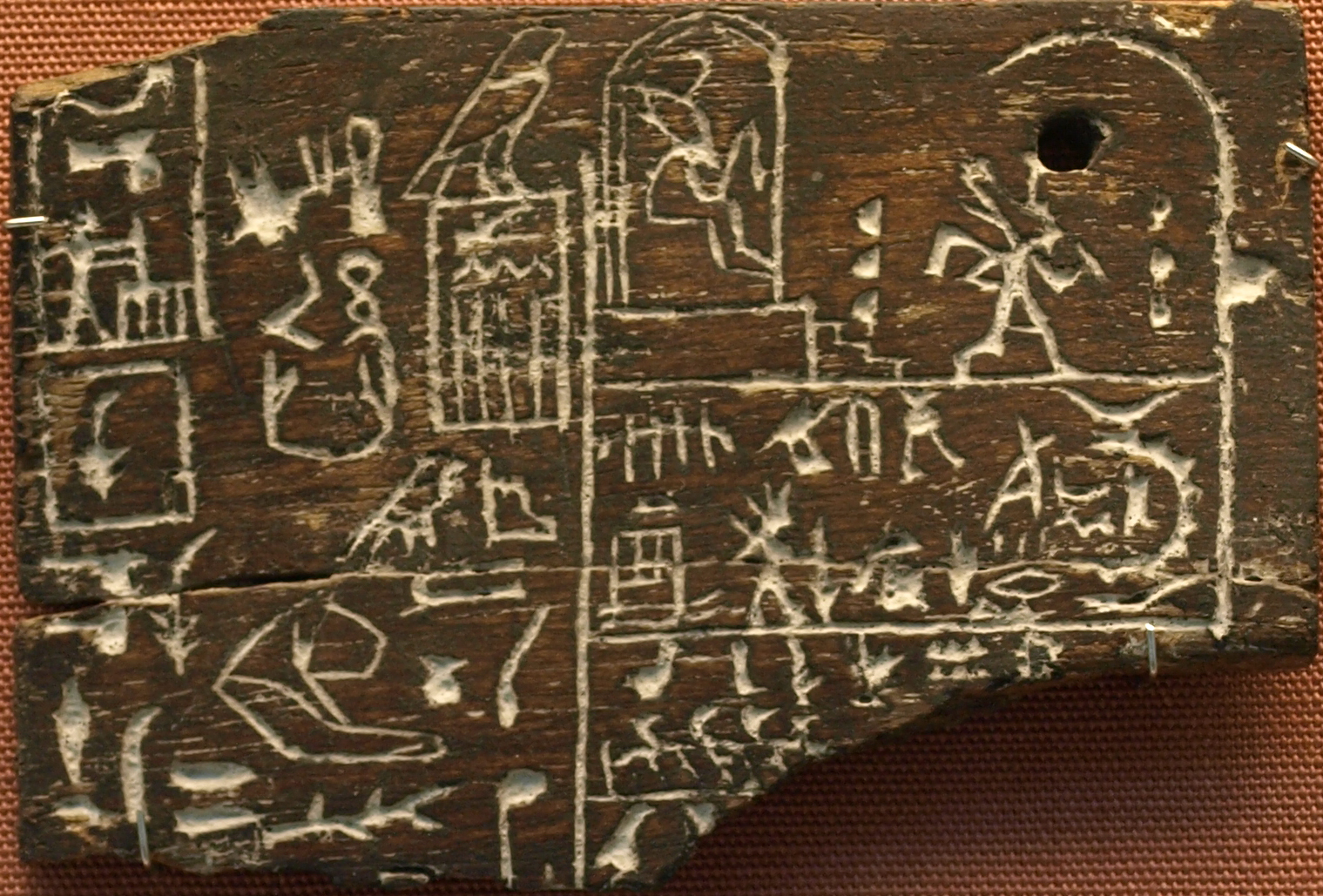
Object label of Pharaoh Den.

Two labels are known from the Old Kingdom showing usage of the branch hieroglyph, one by Pharaoh Den, one by Semerkhet. The usage on the labels shows the branch hieroglyph in a more archaic form.

=== Rosetta Stone usage of branch--"khet" ===
In the 198 BC, Rosetta Stone the branch hieroglyph is used six times, lines R1 combined with N23-(the Nubayrah Stele), R5, R6, R9, R13 and R14.

The Rosetta Stone usage of the hieroglyph is somewhat distinctive:

line R1–M3 X1 Z1"kh-t",
".... Were brought some of them (rebels) into White Wall (Memphis, Egypt-"Aneb-Hetch-t"), at the festival of the receiving behold of the kingdom from his father, slaying by placing [them] upon stakes[s]."

line R5–N35 M3 Aa1 X1 Z9 D40"nekh-t" for "might"-(Nike, as the goddess of Victory: Greek Nike)
".... As a reward for-(using "ancestry" hieroglyph), these things have given him (Ptolemy V) the gods and goddesses: victory, might, life, strength, health, (AUS) and everything good to the fullest possible extent of them;..."
line R6–Same usage of might, but instead strong:
".... Ptolemy, the Avenger of Baq-t the interpretation whereof is Ptolemy, the strong one of Kam-t-(Egypt)..."
line R9–Used in a prepositional phrase: "em-khet", literally vertical letter "M"-(vertical form of Gardiner U31, unlisted-U31) with the branch hieroglyph.
lines R13/R14–M3 Aa1 X1 D40 Z7 X1-"khet-tu", (both lines reconstructed except "-tu" of R13). "To inscribe", upon the priest's rings, and on the Rosetta Stone, (i.e. the Decree of Memphis (Ptolemy V)), in the three scripts: Egyptian hieroglyphs, Egyptian Demotic, and the Greek language.

== Variant forms ==
One common variant form of the branch hieroglyph is combined with the tree, M1,

M1

, and

M3

in a ligature, Gardiner Aa40,

Aa40

, (there is also an Aa41 with the tree).

== Example words ==
=== Ramses II at Abu Simbel ===
N35 M3 Aa1 X1
"N-(kh)-t"-(Nekht)
Strength
Victory
Might
in hieroglyphs

A wall relief inside the Great Temple of Abu Simbel shows Ramses II smiting Libyans. Young Ramses in a chariot is shown on the left, bow drawn, charging into Syrian ranks. On the right he is standing over one prone Libyan fighter, and is smiting another with a mace-club in his right hand, while holding the Libyan fighter with his extended left arm. The extensive military scenes are commemorating his military victories, and the hieroglyphic text explains the specifics of the events.

Above the clasped Libyan fighter is one column of text, (out of a series of about 15 columns, variable in height), describing the "victory-buildings", the strongholds that the captives will be confined in. The text explains that Ramses and the Egyptian army went after three groups of rebels, and then confined them.

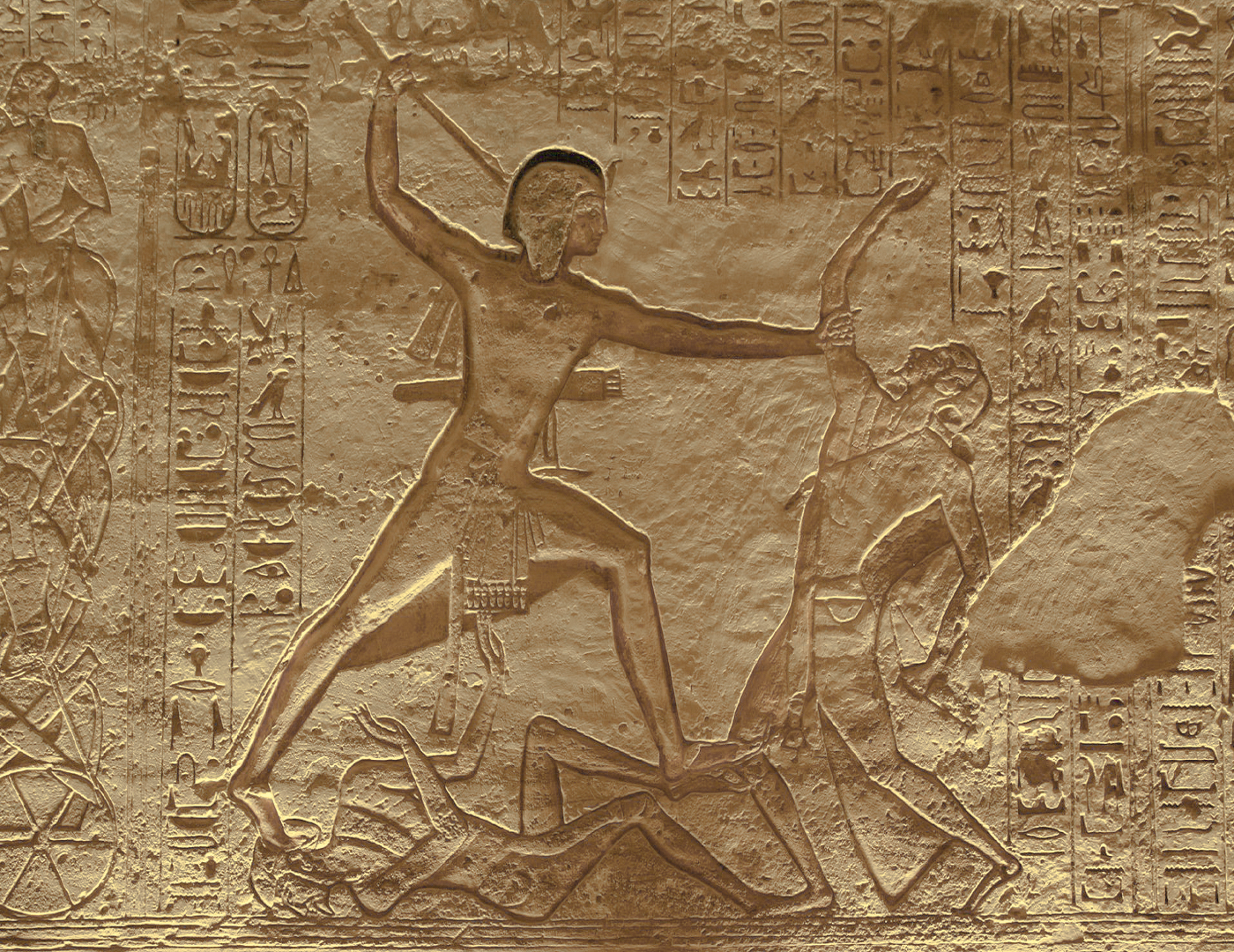
"Smiting Libyan" portion of extensive military relief section, Great Temple of Abu Simbel.

Above the Libyan captive's arm is a column of text, (see here: ), and the column states: "...the 'strong-buildings', ...constructed by pharaoh,..." The last two hieroglyphs in the vertical text show a vertical wall hieroglyph and constructing-man-(mason), and the horizontal arm holding a "power scepter", (showing an action of force by one's arm-(hands), i.e. the constructing of the wall, the "stronghold" building). The hieroglyphs are Gardiner A35-(with foot raised onto side of wall-(variation)), A35, D40-(arm showing action of force: Egyptian language: djser, for "power"). D40 Combined they are: A35 D40. The scene is also shown here (expands into high-res):

=== Block statue of Bakenkhonsu ===
r N35
A2 A2
mn N35 Y1

Column 2
title of
Bakenkhonsu, etc.
in hieroglyphs

Ramesses II's 1st Order priest Bakenkhonsu, a High Priest of Amun-Ra of the 13th century BC has a nearly undamaged block statue. The statue presents four columns of hieroglyphs on its frontal face, and a horizontal inscription on the plinth. The vertical texts of hieroglyphs cover about fourteen vertical compositional blocks. (see here )

The first column addresses the gods: Amun-Ra, Tem-(Atum), then Horus, Mut and Khonsu. Column 2 uses the branch hieroglyph to state the title he assumes. The sentence starts as follows:

"...Title permanent in Uas-t, DjedU, "Strength (of) Eternity" by Soul of Ra-forefront, Emeer-(governor), (of) God-Priests..."

r N35 mn N35 Y1

Aa15 R19 X1 O49 R11 R11 Z7 Z4 Y1

M3 Aa1 X1 D54 V28 N5 V28

N35 D28 Z1 N35 r Z1 D36 F4 F20 R8 U36 U36 U36

In ancient Egyptian mythology or ancient Egyptian religion, the location: R19 X1 O49 R11 R11 Z7 Z4 Y1"Uas-t, DjedU," is part of the cemetery of: "The West", Djed-Djed-(in plural with w, (u, the coil hieroglyph, or the quail chick)). Many of the gods are shown as the "overseer of The West", the cemetery for souls; often it is Osiris, or Anubis reclined on his elevated box. It should be understood, that when any individual soul dies, soul-YYYY, he/she is called "Osiris YYYY", namely His Soul in Death. He/she has now become part of Osiris, (with all the other dead souls).
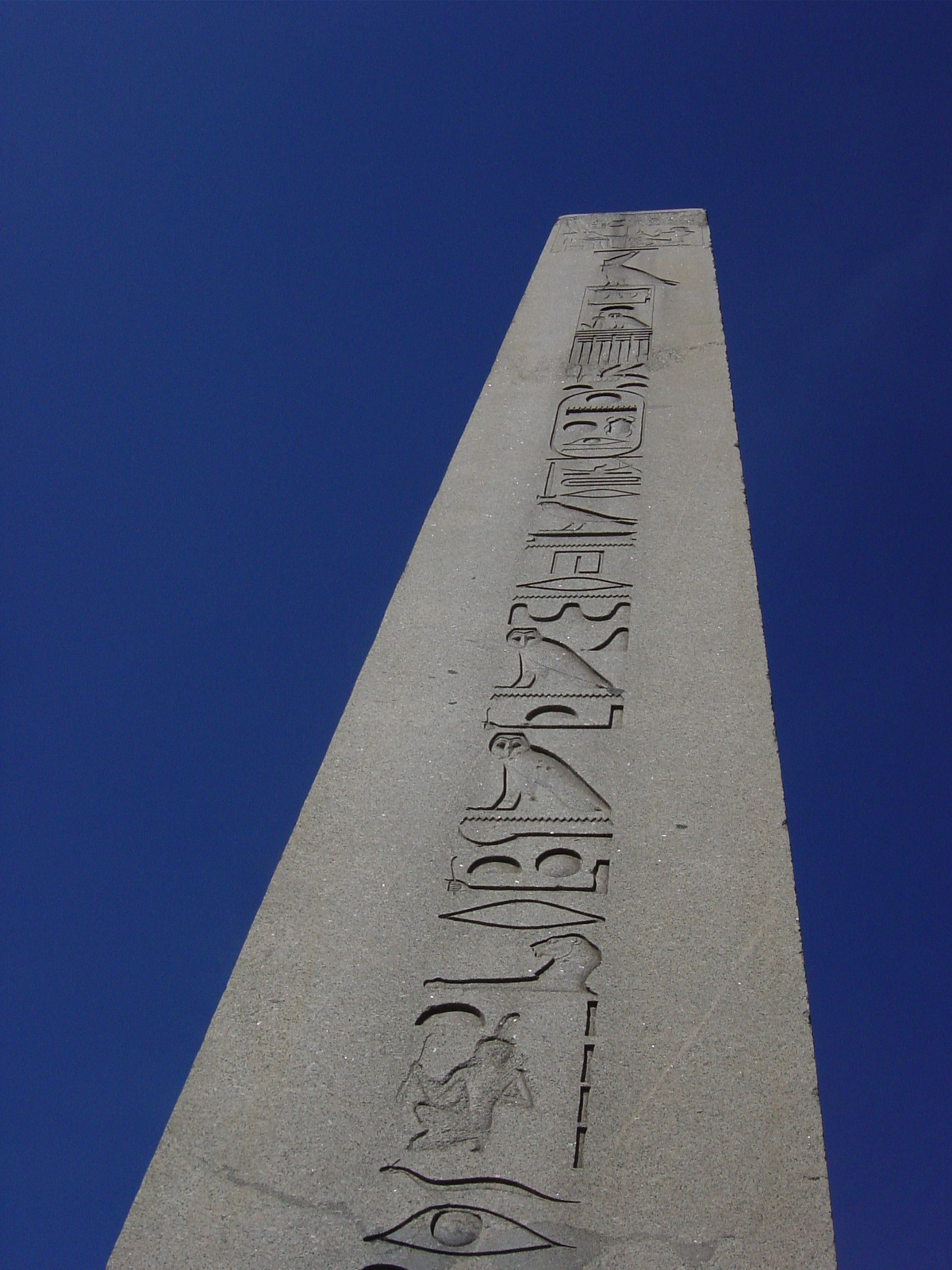
An obelisk of Thutmose III in Istanbul

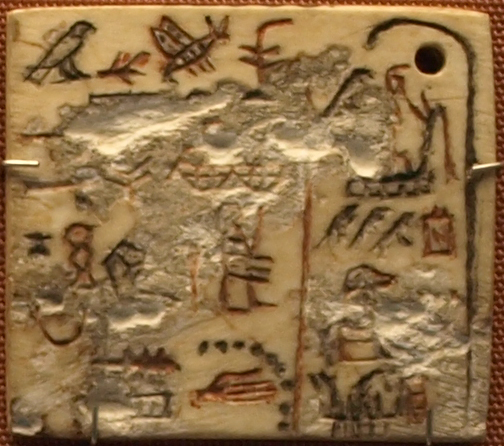
Ivory label of Pharaoh Semerkhet

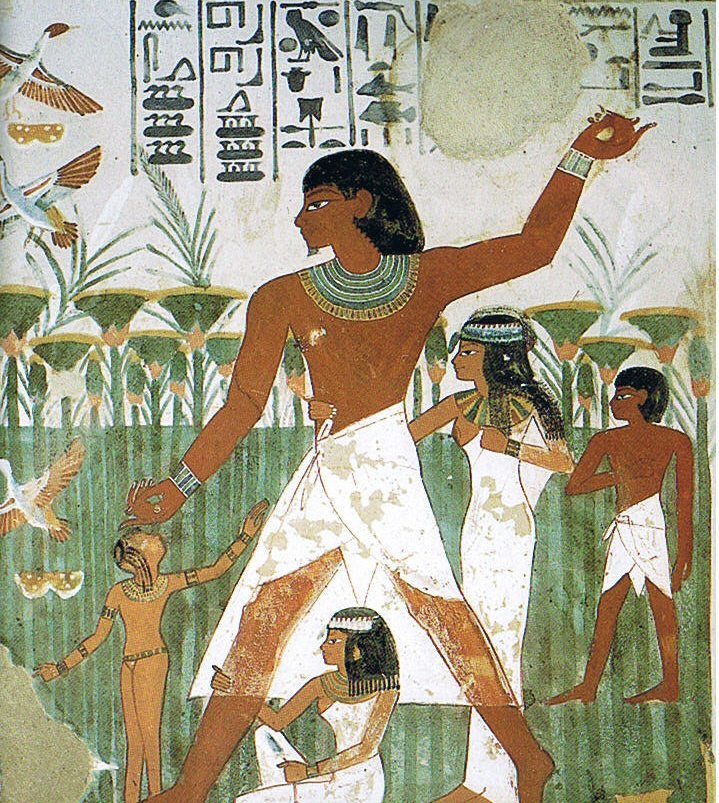
The Tomb of Nakht-(TT52), for Nakht.
(His name is shown as "Nakht", 'Mighty-(One)'(?).)

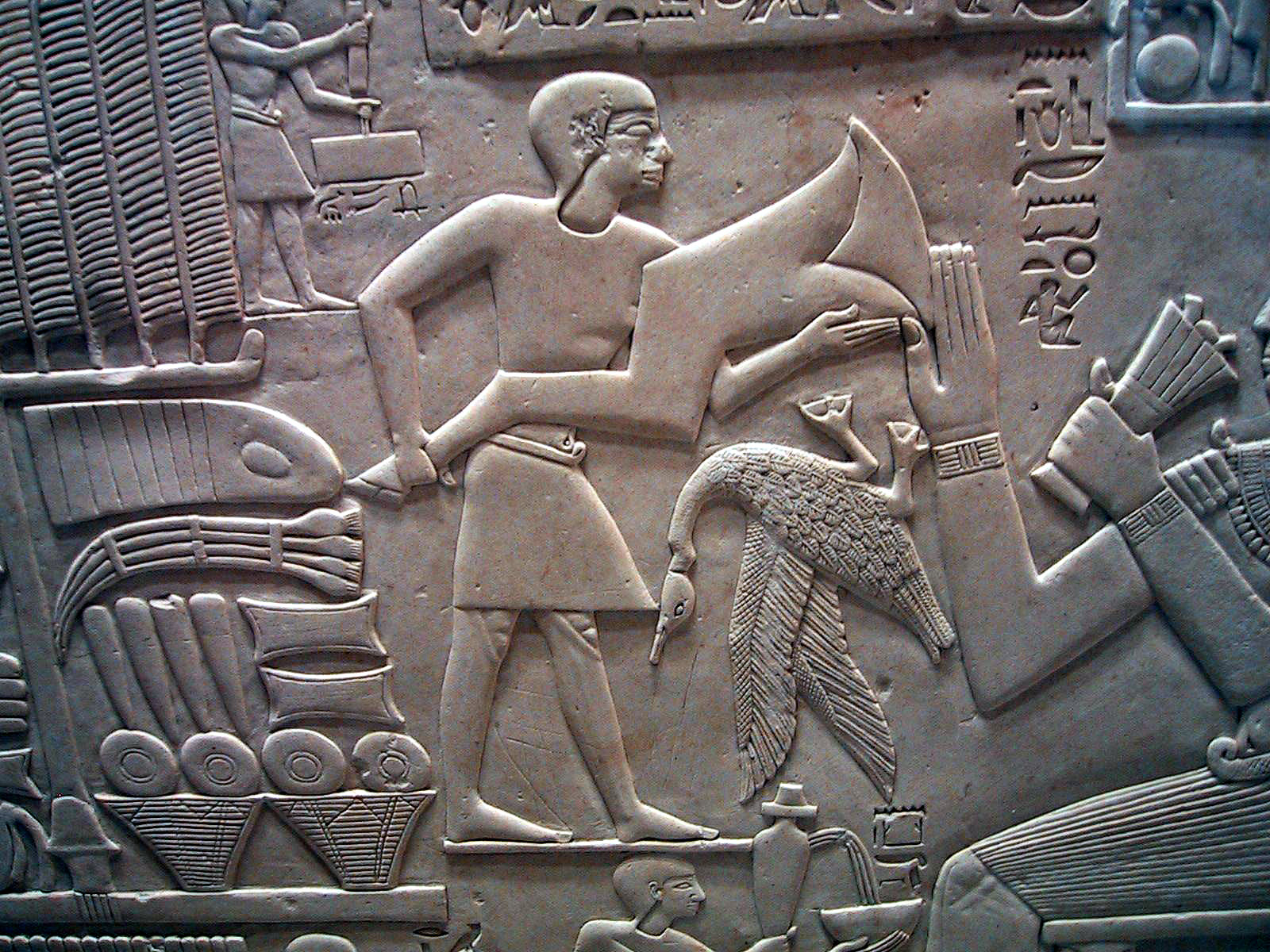
Foreleg of ox being offered.

== See also ==
- Gardiner's Sign List#M. Trees and Plants
- Gardiner's Sign List#Aa. Unclassified
- List of Egyptian hieroglyphs
