= Elizabeth Stanton =

Elizabeth Stanton may refer to:

- Elizabeth Stanton (television host) (born 1995), American television host
- Elizabeth Cady Stanton (1815–1902), American social activist and abolitionist
- Elizabeth Cady Stanton Blake (1894–1981), American painter
- Elizabeth Stanton (Massachusetts politician), American Democratic politician
