= Bessie Callender =

American sculptor (1889–1951)

Bessie Stough Callender
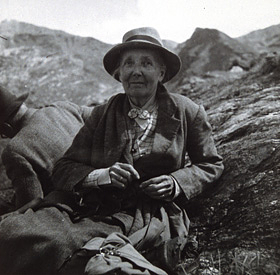
- Born: c. 1889; Wichita, Kansas
- Died: June 26, 1951 (aged 62); New York, New York
- Known for: Sculpture
- Spouse: Harold Callender

Bessie Callender (née Stough; c. 1889 – June 26, 1951) was an American sculptor most well known for her sculptures of wildlife in the style of the French animaliers.

== Biography ==
Bessie Stough was born near Wichita, Kansas around 1889 and spent most of her childhood on a farm, where her interest in animals originated. She moved to New York in the early 1920s after marrying The New York Times journalist Harold Callender. Here, she studied drawing under George Bridgman, at the Art Students League, and the Cooper Union. She also modeled from life. When she and her husband were transferred to Paris in 1926, she studied under Antoine Bourdelle, and later under the important animalier, Georges Hilbert. It was under Hilbert's supervision that she began the stone carvings of animals she received the most acclaim for.

Callender's process began with observing animals in either the Jardin des Plantes or the London Zoo. Then, she would produce sketches and plasticine studies of an animal, until the "spirit" of the creature was captured. After that, she began to carve, and could take up to a year refining a single piece. The condensed forms and highly polished surfaces of her works show the influence of Egyptian sculpture, specifically block statues, which she considered to be the finest in the world.

Her sculpture was immediately recognized for its quality and was frequently exhibited at the Salon des Independants in Paris and the Royal Academy in London. She continued to work until a cancer operation prevented her from sculpting later in life. After her death at the age of 62, in 1951, her husband donated seven of her sculptures to the Smithsonian American Art Museum.
