= Bakenkhonsu =

Ancient Egyptian High Priest of Amun

- High Priest of Amun
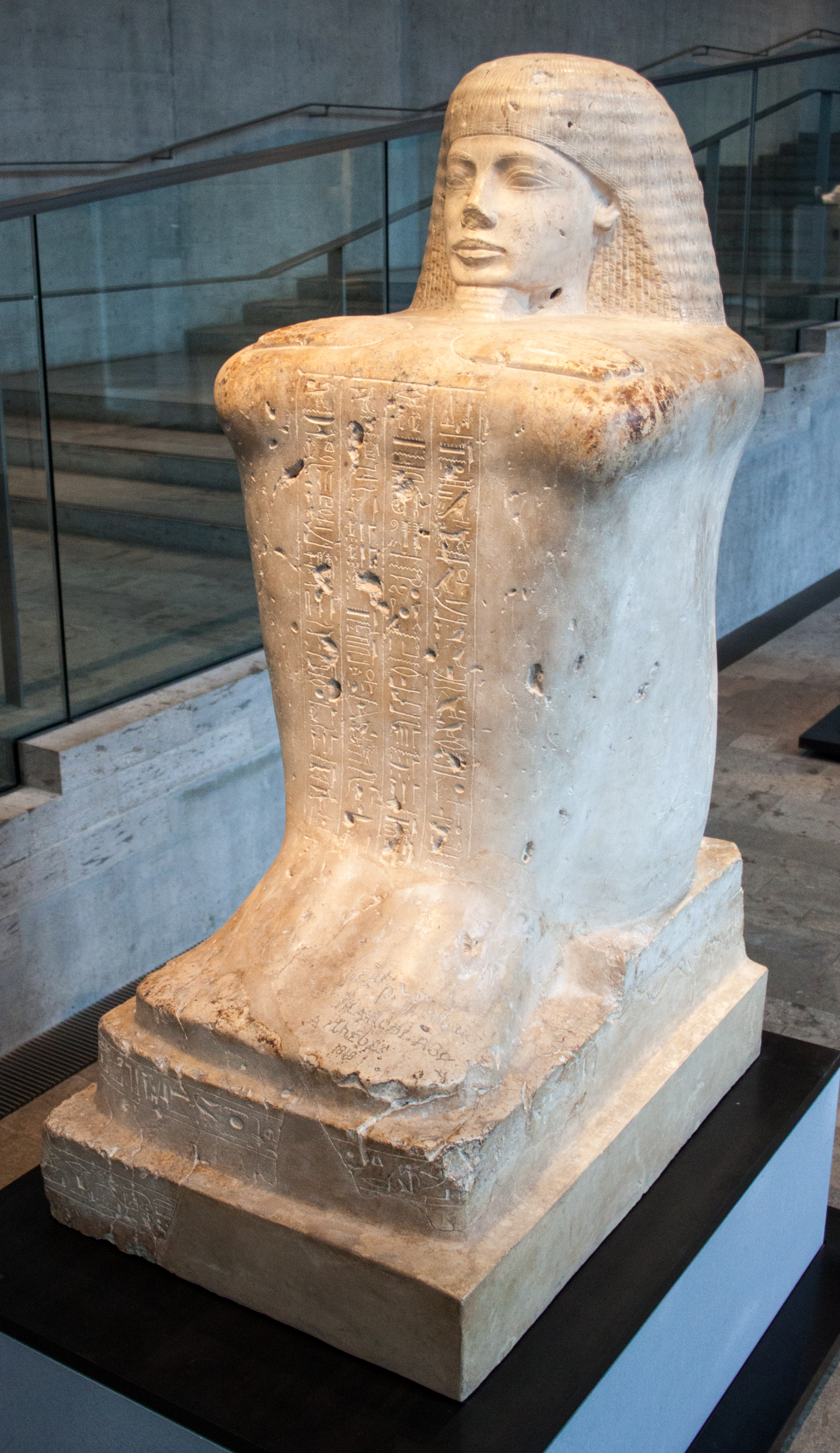
- Block statue of Bakenkhonsu at Munich
Egyptian name
G39 V31 N35 Aa1 N35 s A51
- Predecessor: Paser
- Successor: Roma called Roy
- Dynasty: 19th Dynasty
- Pharaoh: Ramesses II
- Burial: Thebes
- Spouse: Meretseger
- Father: Ipui
- Children: Paser; Amenmesse; Nefertari

Bakenkhonsu ("Servant of Khonsu") was a High Priest of Amun in ancient Egypt during the reign of Pharaoh Ramesses II. Information about his life was found on the back of his block statue (which is now located in Munich). The information on the statue provides details about the education of young Egyptian noblemen at that time and the career of priests.

Bakenkhonsu is named for the god Khonsu, traveller, a Moon God of ancient Egypt and son of Amun.

== Life ==
According to the information inscribed on his statue, Bakenkhonsu was the son of Ipui, a priest of Amun (other sources suggest that he was the son of Roma, whose wife was also called Roma). His two younger brothers were Roma-Roi and Ipui. He spent four years at school, starting at the age of four, as was customary at that time. He then worked at the stables of Pharaoh Seti I for eleven years. There he learned to shoot with a bow and to drive a chariot. It is possible that he also served in the Pharaoh's army.

Bakenkhonsu's career as a priest then began when he joined Amun's priesthood in Thebes where his father already served as a priest (Ipui later became Second Prophet of Amun). Bakenkhonsu served as a wab priest (lowest priestly rank) for four years. He was then promoted to the rank of prophet and, twelve years later, he was the Third Prophet of Amun, the third highest ranking priest in the most powerful priesthood of the era. Later he was promoted to second, then to first prophet or high priest, a position he held for twenty-seven years. He died in the last regnal year of Ramesses II, at the age of ninety, and was succeeded as High Priest by his brother Roma-Roi.

Bakenkhonsu was responsible for several building projects for the Pharaoh, including the eastern temple in the Karnak Temple complex.

Bakenkhonsu was married to Meretseger, who held the titles of Chief of the Harem of Amun. Two of their sons, Paser and Amenmesse became governors of Thebes. Their daughter, Nefertari married Tjanefer, the Third Prophet of Amun and three of her sons and a grandson became high ranking priests (fourth, third, or second prophets of Amun). The family is related to another important family of priests which included Ramessesnakht, who was High Priest of Amun during the 20th dynasty, as Nefertari's son Amenemopet married Ramessesnakht's daughter Tamerit/Aatmerit.

== Autobiographical texts ==
Bakenkhons has left autobiographical inscriptions on statues from Karnak, one of which is now in a museum in Munich.

Bakenkhons outlines his life as follows:

- I spent 4 years as a promising youngster
- I spent 11 years as a youngster, when I was a trainee Stablemaster of King Menmare
- I was a wab-priest of Amun for 4 years
- I was a God's Father of Amun for 12 years
- I was a Third Prophet of Amun for 15 years
- I was a Second Prophet of Amun for 12 years
- He showed me favor, because he recognized the worth of my character. He appointed me High Priest of Amun for 27 years (already).

On another statue – from Cairo (CGC 42155) – Bakenkhons mentions that he came from Thebes and that his parents also were Thebans. He spent some years at the scribal school in the Temple of the Lady of Heaven, and he was taught to be a wab-priest by his own father in the House of Amun.

== Burial ==
Bakenkhons was buried in TT35 in Thebes. In the hallway there are several depictions of Bakenkhons and his wife Meretseger. A niche contains seated statues of Bakenkhons and his wife. The tomb also had a pyramid associated with it.

Bakenkhonsu's sarcophagus is now located in the World Museum Liverpool (M13864). Other finds from the tomb include a wooden scribe's palette in the form of a hes vase, which is now in the Louvre (N 3018), and a block statue, which is now in the Munich Staatliche Sammlung für Ägyptische Kunst. The block statue inscribed with four vertical columns of hieroglyphs relating his life story. The plinth of the block statue is also engraved with hieroglyphs.

His name Soul (of) Khonsu, Soul of The Traveller may relate to the title given on his block statue: Victory Forever for the Soul, using the branch (hieroglyph) for 'victory', n-khet; Forever, h-Ra-h, (the h-(wick hieroglyph)), being in a hieroglyphic block for 'Eternity', and the 'Soul', in another block for: "for the soul of", or "for the spirit of", yielding: Victory Forever for the Soul.

== See also ==
- Branch (hieroglyph)#Block statue of Bakenkhonsu
