= Clark Hulings =

American painter

- Born: November 20, 1922; Florida
- Died: February 2, 2011 (aged 88); Santa Fe, New Mexico
- Education: Sigismund Ivanowsky; George Bridgman; Art Students League of New York
- Known for: Painting
- Movement: Realism
- Awards: The Council of American Artists’ award The Allied Artists of America gold medal Prix de West; Cowboy Hall of Fame trustees' Gold Medal

Clark Hulings (November 20, 1922 – February 2, 2011) was an American realist painter. He was born in Florida and raised in New Jersey. Clark also lived in Spain, New York, Louisiana, and throughout Europe before settling in Santa Fe, New Mexico, in the early 1970s. The travels did much to influence his keen eye for people in the state of accomplishing daily tasks.

His training as an artist began as a teenager with Sigismund Ivanowsky and George Bridgman, and concluded at the Art Students League of New York with Frank Reilly. Clark came back to the League to give a lecture in 2007.

After early careers in portraiture and illustration, he devoted himself to easel painting. A modern genre painter, he is best known for his elaborate European and Mexican market and street scenes, his still lifes of roses and his depictions of donkeys. For the past forty years Hulings’ art has been eagerly sought after by collectors, museums and corporations.

== Early life and early career ==
Clark Hulings was born in 1922 in Florida, where his father, Courtland Marcus Hulings, was the manager of a plant which produced a gas for fumigating orange trees. His mother died of tuberculosis when he was an infant, and he and his sister, Susan, were sent to live with their maternal grandparents in Potsdam, New York, for the next three years, while his father worked in Valencia, Spain. In Valencia, Hulings’ father, while representing American Cyanamid, courted and married Elena Harker, the 21-year-old daughter of Herbert Edward Harker, the British Consul in Valencia, and his wife, Julia Howard Harker. Courtland Hulings and Elena Harker were married in London, England, in 1925. The two children joined them abroad.

In 1928, the Hulings family returned to the United States, settling in Westfield, New Jersey, where Clark's younger sister, Elena, was born. At the age of twelve, his father arranged art lessons with Sigismund Ivanowski, a portrait and landscape painter who had served as Court Painter to Tsar Nicholas II. In his 1986 book "A Gallery of Paintings," Hulings credits his father with conveying to him his "great love of paintings." By the time Hulings graduated from school in 1940, the tuberculosis which had killed his mother left him in fragile health. He was unable to enter college. However, he did continue a limited schedule with Ivanowski, as well as with George Bridgman, the celebrated drawing teacher, at the Art Students League of New York.

In the fall of 1941, Hulings was well enough to enroll at Haverford College. After graduating in 1944 with a degree in Physics, he was appointed to work on the Manhattan Project in Los Alamos, New Mexico. Yet his recurring ill health prevented his acceptance into the program. Instead, he remained in Santa Fe to recuperate, supporting himself by painting pastel portraits of children. In the spring of 1945 he was given a one-man show of landscapes at the New Mexico Museum of Fine Art.

== Portraiture and illustration ==
In 1946 Hulings moved to Baton Rouge, Louisiana where his parents lived at the time, and he had a one-man show of his work at the galleries of the Louisiana Art Commission. He included several portraits of family members and the show launched him on his successful career as a portrait painter. Hulings continued to paint landscapes and also became interested in design and illustration work, which led him back to The Art Students League for three years beginning in 1948 - this time as a student of Frank Reilly, a noted teacher and artist himself. In 1951 he gained employment doing wash drawings for a newspaper mat agency that specializing in supermarket ads. He gradually moved up to paperback book covers and magazine illustrations, by 1955, his illustration career was firmly established.

But the lure of landscape painting sent him to Europe, first for four months, and later for almost three years. Over the course of his travels he studied figure painting in Florence, abstract design in Düsseldorf and roamed from the Arctic Circle to Southern Egypt.

Hulings returned to New York City in the fall of 1960 and resumed his illustration career to recoup finances. But he planned his work schedule to include serious easel painting.

== Easel painting ==
By 1962 Hulings was earning enough with his easel painting to devote all of his attention to his lifelong path. He was admitted to the Grand Central Art Galleries, which represented him for the next eight years and held one-man shows of his work in 1965 and 1967. Hulings also began placing paintings in competitive shows of realistic art, winning several prizes, including The Council of American Artists’ award at the Hudson Valley Art Association for Restaurante Vicente, and the gold medal given by the Allied Artists of America for Ontinyent. He moved back to the artistic and cultural magnet of Santa Fe, New Mexico after a doctor suggested that it would be good for his health, due to dormant tuberculosis that was being aggravated by New York City pollution.

In 1973 he garnered the first ever Prix de West award at the National Academy of Western Art (NAWA) in Oklahoma City for his painting "Grand Canyon - Kaibab Trail". This is an enormous oil that portrays a mule team barely navigating the Grand Canyon in deep winter snow. He went on to win three silver and two gold medals for both oil and watercolor at subsequent competitions at NAWA, part of the National Cowboy & Western Heritage Museum.

In 1976 A Collection of Oil Paintings by Clark Hulings was published by The Lowell Press as a catalog to accompany a one-man show at the Cowboy Hall of Fame under the auspices of NAWA. He was presented with the Hall’s Trustees Gold Medal for his "distinguished contribution to American art". Two years later he was honored with a comprehensive retrospective of his work in Midland, Texas. In 1980, Hulings’s painting The Pink Parasol won wide acclaim at the annual Western Heritage Sale in Houston, Texas. His market scene, Kaleidescope, submitted in the 1981 sale, brought another record sale price. In 1999 he mounted a new one-man show at Nedra Matteucci Galleries in Santa Fe, New Mexico. It included thirty-five paintings, ten field sketches and twelve drawings. Everything sold on opening night. In 2007 he topped this success with another one-man show, this time in two venues. Timeless Beauty: Pursuing Life’s Textures included 36 paintings, 21 of which were sold at Bartfield Galleries in New York, and 15 of which were auctioned on Hilton Head, South Carolina through Morris & Whiteside Galleries. Once again, everything sold immediately. In conjunction with the show a revised edition of his book, A Gallery of Paintings, was also released.

== Personal life ==
Hulings married Mary Belfi in 1966 and their daughter Elizabeth Hulings was born two years later. When they were not traveling, they lived in Santa Fe, New Mexico. His Cousin Florence Hulings was also a painter

== See also ==
- The Clark Hulings Fund
