= TT34 =

Ancient Egyptian tomb

Coordinates: 25.7333°N 32.6000°E

Theban tomb TT34
- Burial site of Mentuemhat
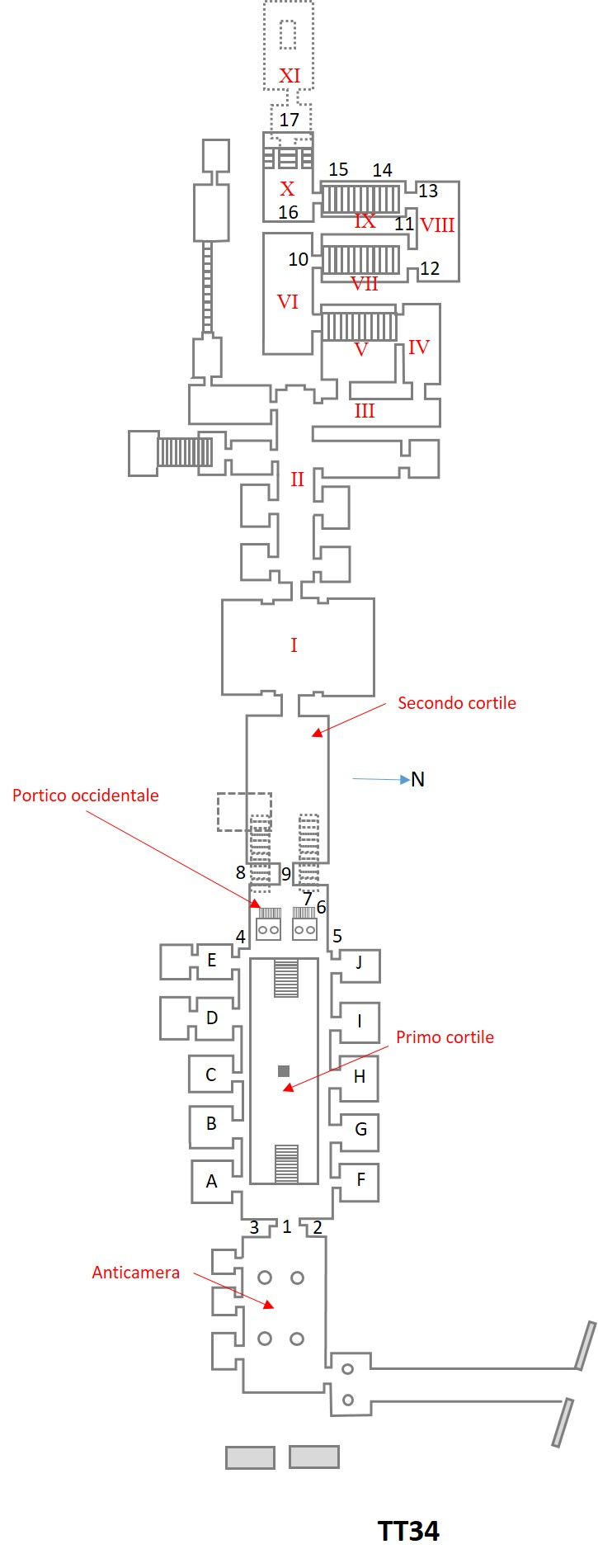
- Floor plan of TT34

- Location within Egypt
- Location: El-Assasif, Theban Necropolis
- ← Previous; TT33 Next → TT35

The Theban Tomb TT34 is located in El-Assasif. It forms part of the Theban Necropolis, situated on the west bank of the Nile opposite Luxor. The tomb is the burial place of the ancient Egyptian official, Mentuemhat.

Mentuemhat was the 4th Prophet of Amun, Mayor of Thebes, Governor of Upper Egypt, and served during the reigns of Taharqa and Psamtik I. He was the son of Nesptah, a prophet of Amun and Mayor of the city, and Esenkhebi. His wives are named Wadjerenes (the daughter of Har, and granddaughter of King Piye), Eskhons, and Shepetenmut.

== See also ==
- List of Theban tombs
