= Harold Callender =

Harold Callender (September 29, 1892 – October 8, 1959) was an American journalist and foreign correspondent for The New York Times. His wife was the sculptor Bessie Callender.

== Works ==
- "A Single Word that Sums Up a Nation". The New York Times. January 28, 1934.
- "The Germans in Germany: A significant change in the public temper towards the Hitler regime has come about in recent months". Current History. 49 (6): 22–24. 1939.
- A Preface to Peace. New York: Alfred A. Knopf. 1944.
- "6 European Lands Name Pool Chiefs; Economic and Atomic Energy Community Posts Filled — Capital Still Issue". The New York Times. January 8, 1958. p. 1.
