= TT35 =

Theban tomb

Coordinates: 25.7333°N 32.6000°E

Theban tomb TT35
- Burial site of Bakenkhonsu
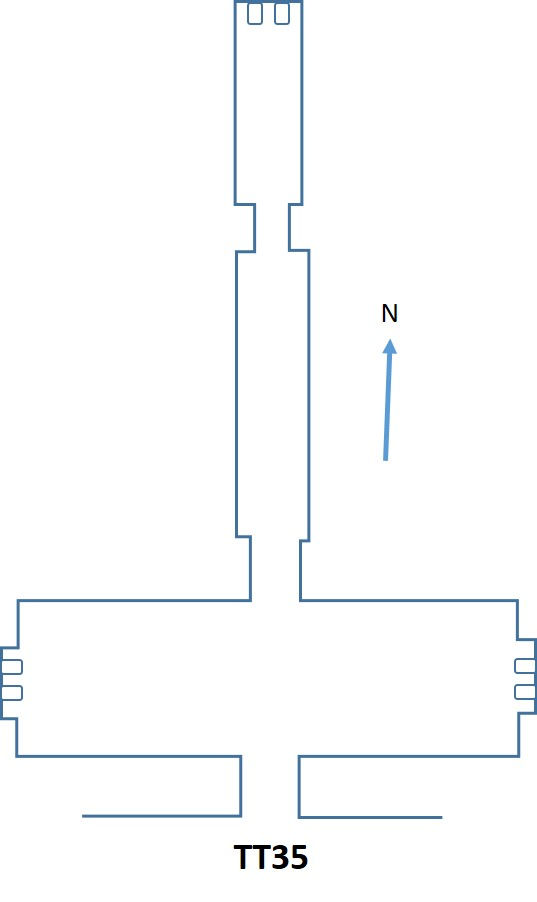

- Location within Egypt
- Location: Dra' Abu el-Naga', Theban Necropolis
- ← Previous; TT34 Next → TT36

G29 V31 N35 Aa1 N35 M23
Bakenkhonsu
in hieroglyphs
Era: New Kingdom
(1550–1069 BC)

The Theban Tomb TT35 is located in Dra' Abu el-Naga', part of the Theban Necropolis, on the west bank of the Nile, opposite to Luxor. It is the burial place of the ancient Egyptian noble named Bakenkhonsu, who lived during the 19th Dynasty, during the reign of Seti I and Ramesses II. Bakenkhonsu, Bakenkhons, or Bekenkhons was a High Priest of Amun. His Tomb was excaveted by the Expedition of the Museum of the University of Pennsylvania in 1921–1923.

He was the son of Roma, as well High Priest of Amun and his wife who was also called Roma. Bakenkhonsus' wife was named Meretseger, Mertseger, or Mersagret. She held the titles of Chief of the Harem of Amun.

== See also ==
- List of Theban tombs
