= George Bridgman =

Canadian-American painter, writer and teacher (1864–1943)

- Born: November 5, 1864; United Province of Canada
- Died: December 16, 1943 (aged 79); New York City, United States
- Education: École des Beaux-Arts
- Known for: Painter, art educator, draftsman

George Brant Bridgman RCA (November 5, 1864 – December 16, 1943) was a Canadian-American painter, writer, and teacher in the fields of anatomy and figure drawing. Bridgman taught anatomy for artists at the Art Students League of New York for some 45 years.

== Life and work ==
Bridgman was born in 1864 in the United Province of Canada. In his youth, Bridgman studied the arts under painter and sculptor Jean-Léon Gérôme at the École des Beaux-Arts in Paris, and later with Gustave Boulanger. For most of his life Bridgman lived in the United States where he taught anatomy and figure drawing at the Art Students League of New York (from 1898 until 1900, and then 1903 until October 1943). His successor at Art Students League was Robert Beverly Hale. Bridgman had also taught classes at the Grand Central School of Art and at the American Bank Note Company.

Bridgman used box forms to represent the major masses of the figure (head, thorax, and pelvis) which he would tie together with gestural lines and produce to create "wedges" or simplified interconnecting forms of the body.

He had been a member of the Royal Canadian Academy of Arts.

== Notable students ==
Among his many thousands of students was Norman Rockwell; in his autobiography, My Adventures as an Illustrator (1960), Rockwell spoke highly of Bridgman. Roughly 70,000 students studied with Bridgman in his many years of teaching, notable artists include: McClelland Barclay, Emily Newton Barto, C. C. Beall, Gifford Beal, Elizabeth Cady Stanton Blake, Rosina Cox Boardman, Bessie Callender, Dane Chanase, Richard V. Culter, Chon Day, Joseph Delaney, Elsie Driggs, Eyre de Lanux, Helen Winslow Durkee, Will Eisner, Edward McNeil Farmer, Elias Goldberg, Marion Greenwood, Robert Beverly Hale, Lorenzo Homar, Clark Hulings, Louis Paul Jonas, Jack Kamen, Deane Keller, Lee Krasner, Richard Lahey, Andrew Loomis, Anita Malfatti, Paul Manship, Frank McCarthy, Evelyn Metzger, Earl Moran, John Cullen Murphy, Kimon Nicolaïdes, Corrado Parducci, Norman Raeben, Frank J. Reilly, Joseph Emile Renier, Ulysses Ricci, Ernie Schroeder, Archie Boyd Teater, Allie Tennant, John Vassos, Franklin Brooke Voss, Edmund Ward, Mahonri Young, and William Zorach.

Jackson Pollock's sketchpad features work from Bridgman's books.

== Death and legacy ==
Bridgman died on December 16, 1943, in New Rochelle, New York, after suffering from an illness for a year. He was survived by his wife, Helene Leonora Bridgman (née Rupperstberg) and their three children.

George Bridgman has 100 drawings in the public collection at the Norman Rockwell Museum.

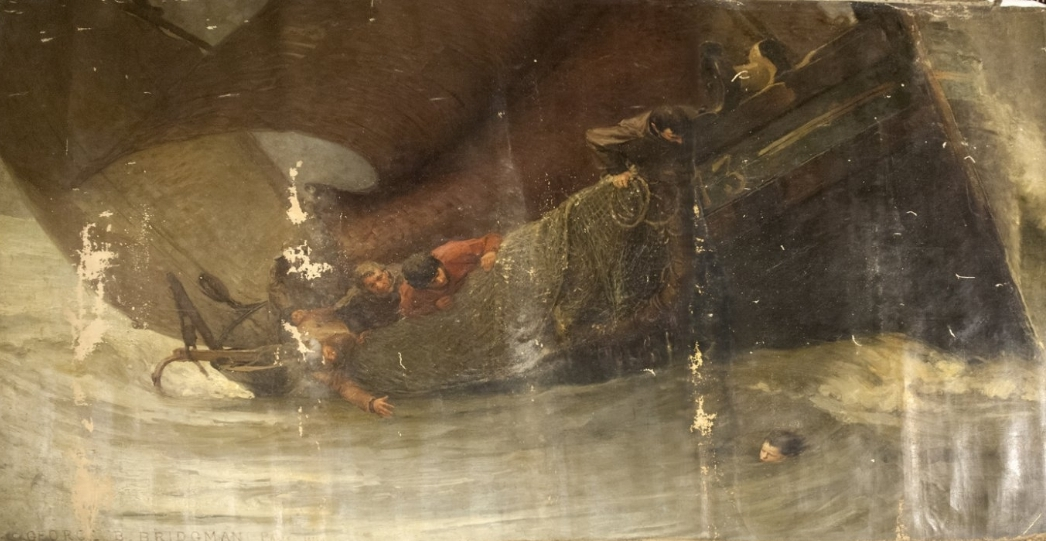
Rescue of a Youth Fallen Overboard from a Fishing Boat, 1888, (Collection Albright-Knox Art Gallery, Buffalo, New York)

== Bibliography ==
- Bridgman, George B.; Simon, Howard (1952). Bridgman's Complete Guide to Drawing from Life. New York City, New York: Weathervane. ISBN 9781402766787.
- Bridgman, George B. (1942). Drawing the Draped Figure. Pelham, New York: Bridgman Publishers. ISBN 9780486138121.
- Bridgman, George B. (1939). The Human Machine.
- Bridgman, George B. (1936). Heads, Features and Faces.
- Bridgman, George B. (1929). Bridgmans Handbook of Drawing.
- Bridgman, George B. (1924). Bridgman's Life Drawing.
- Bridgman, George B. (1920). Constructive Anatomy. Pelham, New York: Bridgman Publishers.
- Bridgman, George B. (1920). The Book of a Hundred Hands. New York City, New York: Sterling Publishing Company. ISBN 9780486132600.

Many of Bridgman's books are available as reprints by Dover Publications.
