= The Clark Hulings Fund =

Nonprofit organization supporting visual artists

The Clark Hulings Foundation (CHF) (formerly The Clark Hulings Fund) is a nonprofit organization that provides visual artists with marketing and financial tools to be able to make a living from their art. Launched in 2013 by the Clark Hulings Estate, CHF offers educational, business, and entrepreneurial programming to working artists and creatives. These programs help visual artists and makers compete in an increasingly complex marketplace.

== History ==
The origin of The Clark Hulings Foundation stems from the life and accomplishments of Clark Hulings. Clark Hulings (November 20, 1922 - February 2, 2011) was an American painter that worked in the realist style.

Before Clark Hulings became a full-time gallery painter, he was a commercial artist and at the age of 40 he decided to quit his job to pursue his painting career. In 1966, Hulings married Mary Belfi and together they had a daughter, Elizabeth. Elizabeth Hulings and her mother would go on to become the main initiators of The Clark Hulings Foundation, sharing Hulings' legacy as a self-sustaining entrepreneur with a new generation of working artists.

== Organization ==
The Clark Hulings Foundation (CHF) is a 501(c)(3) nonprofit organization that promotes the legacy of painter Clark Hulings by equipping working visual artists to be self-sustaining entrepreneurs. CHF showcases Hulings’ life and work as an example to today’s artists, and offers them a comprehensive art-business education so that they can thrive as he did. CHF delivers a suite of integrated learning services continually, both virtually and in-person—via live events, digital channels, and portable media formats—and builds professional networks of opportunity.

CHF runs art-business training programs and events including Brown Bag Lunch peer networking; Thriving Tuesdays™; The Thriving Artist™ podcast hosted by Daniel DiGriz; 1-1 Mentorship & Coaching;Artist Federation networking groups; and Evenings with Hulings Salons.

== Hulings 100 ==
November 20, 2022 marks the launch of a Centennial Celebration of Clark Hulings 100th birthday, starting with a party in Santa Fe, New Mexico and including a major VR exhibit, and a new book by James D. Balestrieri—with preview excerpts published in American Fine Art & Western Art Collector Magazines.
