= Joseph Emile Renier =

American traditionalist artist and professor

- Born: 1887; Union City, New Jersey, U.S.
- Died: October 8, 1966 (aged 78–79); New York City, New York, U.S.
- Education: Art Students League of New York
- Known for: The design of metals, architectural sculpture, reliefs

Joseph Emile Renier (1887–1966) was an American traditionalist artist and professor, best known as a sculptor and medalist. He created architectural sculptures, reliefs, and medals and was active in the New York City and New Jersey area.

== Biography ==
Joseph Emile Renier was born in 1887 in Union City, New Jersey. He studied at the Art Students League of New York with George Bridgman. Reiner also assisted in the studios of Adolph Weinman and Attilio Piccirilli. In 1915 Renier won the Prix de Rome to study at American Academy in Rome, and he studied in Brussels with Victor Rousseau. During World War I, Renier served with the American Red Cross in Italy and returned to the United States by 1921.

Renier taught life drawing at Yale University for 14 years, and taught architecture courses at New York University.

For the 1939 New York World's Fair, Renier created a large sculpture, Speed (created between 1935 and 1945) featuring a stylized, all white figure on a winged horse.

He won many honors and awards for his work, including the Samuel F. B. Morse Medal, the Elizabeth N. Watrous Gold Medal for Sculpture, American Artists Professional League gold metal, and the Daniel Chester French Medal of the National Academy of Design.

== Death and legacy ==
Renier died after a short illness on October 8, 1966, at Wickersham Hospital in New York City. He was survived by his wife Margaret Renier (née Carey) and their daughter.

His work is included in many public museum collections including National Gallery of Art, Smithsonian American Art Museum, Rhode Island School of Design Museum, the Cleveland Museum of Art, Yale University Art Gallery, the Metropolitan Museum of Art, among others.
