= Mentuemhat =

Ancient Egyptian prophet

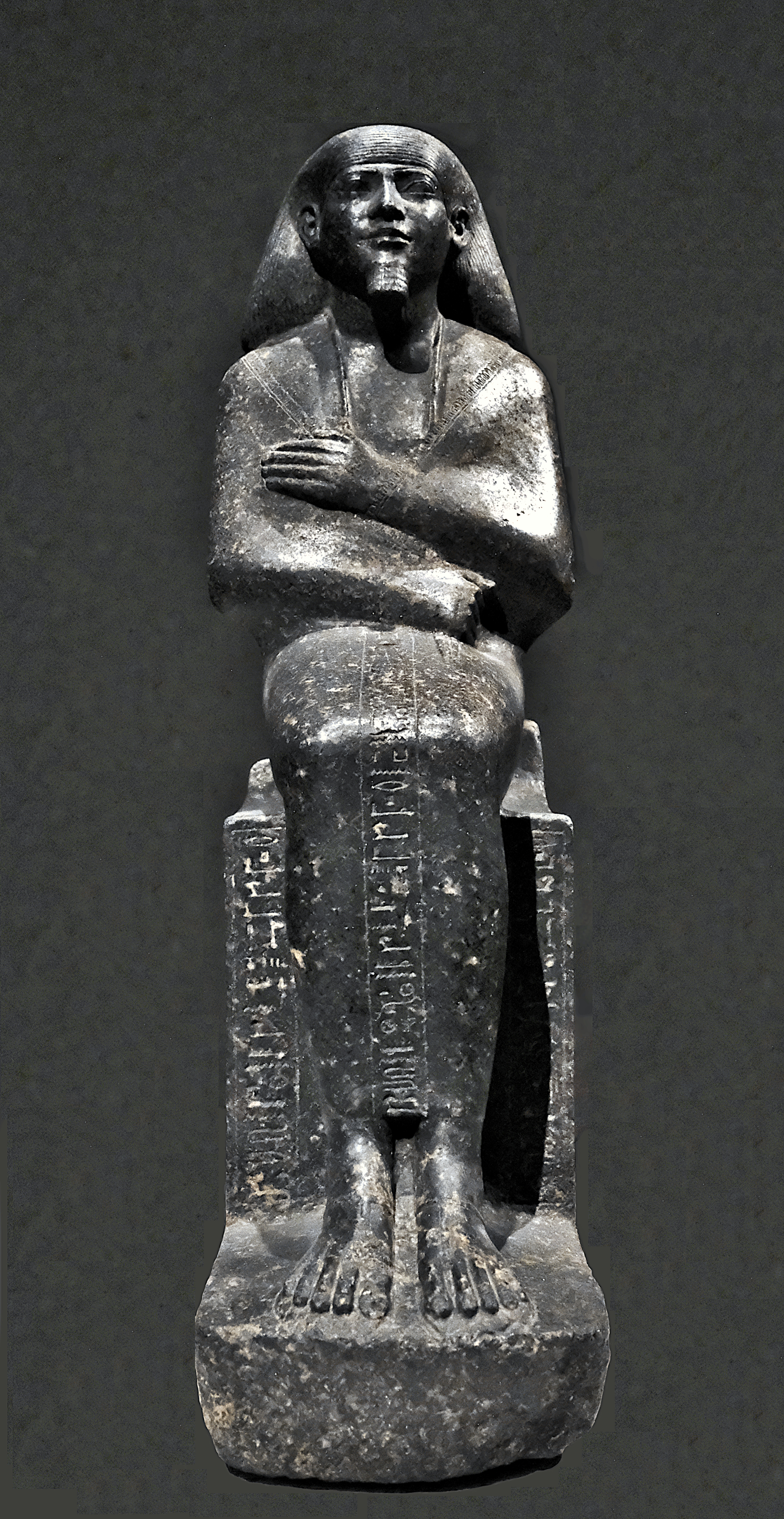
Statue of Montuemhat. Berlin, Neues Museum

mn n T m F4 t Z1
Montuemhat
in hieroglyphs
Era: 3rd Intermediate Period
(1069–664 BC)

Mentuemhat or Montuemhat (c. 700 BCE – c. 650 BCE) was a rich and powerful Theban official from ancient Egypt who lived during the Twenty-fifth Dynasty of Egypt and Twenty-sixth Dynasty of Egypt. He was the Fourth Priest of Amun in Thebes.

He is known from many statues and was buried in tomb TT34 of the Theban Necropolis.

== History ==
Mentuemhat's father likely served as Mayor of Thebes during the reign of Shebitku. Mentuemhat's father Nesptah passed on the position of Mayor of Thebes to his nephew Remmakheru and later to Mentuemhat himself. Mentuemhat served during the reigns of Taharqa and Psamtik I, which cover parts of the Twenty-fifth Dynasty of Egypt and Twenty-sixth Dynasty of Egypt.

When Tantamani came to power he attempted to regain lost territories in Lower Egypt, which he attacked, seizing Memphis and killing the Assyrian vassal Necho I in the process. Subsequently, Assurbanipal attacked Egypt, defeating Tantamani near Memphis, who then fled to Thebes, but the Assyrians pursued him there. Tantamani fled further south, while the Assyrians looted Thebes. After this episode Thebes became a more or less independent entity under the rule of the Mayor Mentuemhat. Thebes would have been ruled by Mentuemhat and the God's Wife Shepenupet II.

When Psamtik I came to the throne he negotiated a deal in year 9 where Shepenupet II adopted Psamtik's daughter Nitocris I. This negotiation would have been overseen by Montuemhat. These events were commemorated in a series of reliefs in the Temple of Mut. The Adoption Stela of Nitocris lists offerings made by Mentuemhat, his son Nesptah and his wife Wadjerenes.

=== Portraiture ===
Mentuemhet was a rich and powerful mayor and priest of Thebes and Governor of Upper Egypt who rebuilt the city after the Assyrians destroyed it. Mentuemhet’s power over Thebes likely is what inspired him to portray himself as a pharaoh in his statuary, like he was king of Egypt—and in the case of Upper Egypt, he de facto was. The Egyptian kings needed to appear as both a ruler and a god and were charged with maintaining stability within the kingdom. Thus Egyptian kings were almost always portrayed as cool and calm, like the Nile, and so Mentuemhet adopted such a motif into his own portraiture. All of Mentuemhet's statues were done in the style of the Old Kingdom of Egypt.

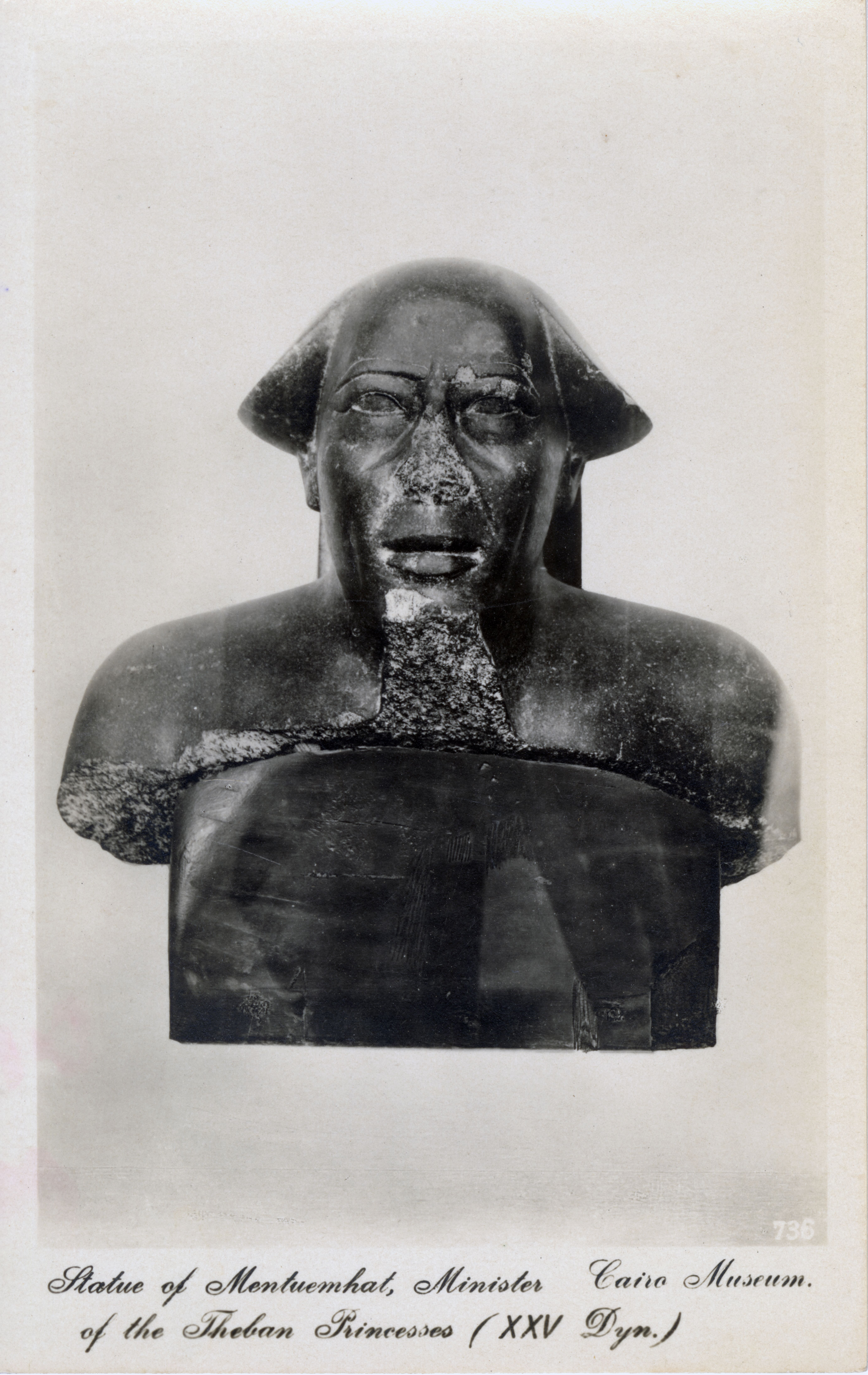
Bust of Montuemhat, Egyptian Museum, Cairo

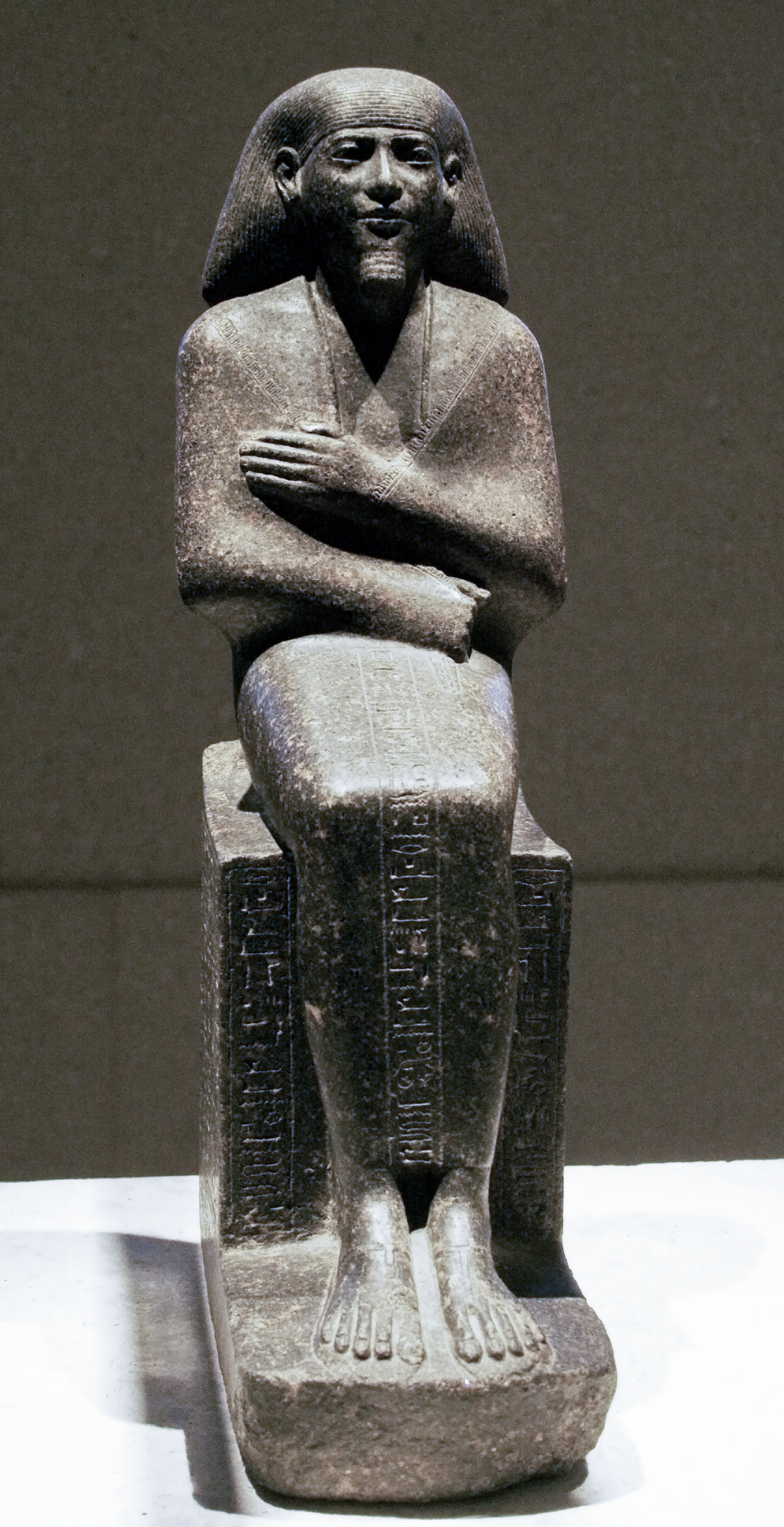
Seated figure of Mentuemhat in Neues Museum, Berlin

== Family ==
Mentuemhat was the son of Nesptah (A), the third Prophet of Amun and Mayor of Thebes, and Istemkheb (C).

Mentuemhat had 3 wives: Neskhonsu, Shepenmut and Wadjerenes.

=== Neskhonsu ===
Neskhonsu (Neskhons, Eskhons) was the first wife of Mentuemhat. She was the mother of the eldest son and heir Nesptah (B). No shabtis inscribed for Neskhonsu have been found in TT34 which may mean she was not buried there.

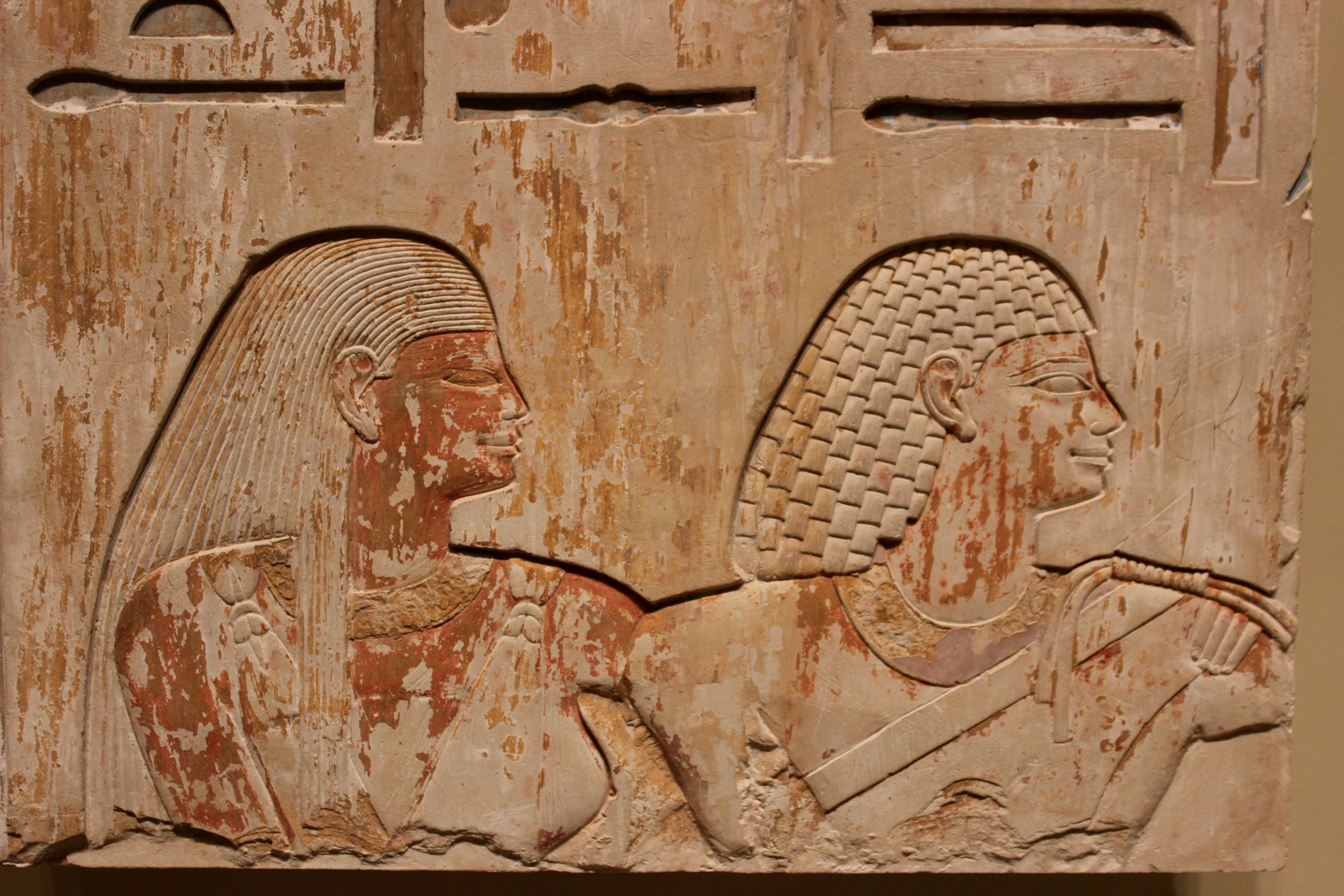
Shepenmut and Montuemhat (Seattle Art Museum)

=== Shepenmut ===
Shepenmut (Shepetenmut) was the second wife of Mentuemhat. She was the mother of a son also called Nesptah. Shepenmut is depicted in the tomb of Mentuemhat (TT34). Shepenmut and Mentuemhat are shown seated in a single chair before an offering table. Both are extending their arms towards the offerings. Shepenmut is depicted with a long tripartite wig and a broad collar. The depiction is typical for the 25th Dynasty.

=== Wadjerenes ===
Wadjerenes (Wedjarenes, Udjarenes), a Sistrum player of Amun-Re. She was a Nubian wife, the daughter of the King's Son (Piankhi-)Har and granddaughter of Piye. The name of her father appears on an offering table found in the First Court of TT34. An inscription in the tomb appears to name her mother as the Lady of the House and Noble Lady Shepmut. Wadjerenes's mother appears to be an Egyptian woman. Wadjerenes and Mentuemhat had a son named Pasher(y)enmut.

== Statues of Mentuemhat ==
Three funerary cones of Montuemhat (National Archaeological Museum, Florence)

- Seated figure in Neues Museum, Berlin
- Kneeling statue at British Museum, EA 1643
- Statue at Egyptian National Museum, Cairo.
- Statue of Montuemhat as an elder man, Cairo, JE 36933
- Block statue of Montuemhat, Cairo, JE 31883
- Block statue of Montuemhat with Osiris, JE 38607
- Bust of Mentuemhat, Cairo, JE 31884, Life size block statue. Found in two parts. Granite.
- Statue of Montuemhat and his son Nesptah, Egyptian Museum, JE 37176
- Statue of Montuemhat (Mentuemhet) Egyptian Museum, JE 336933 (CG 42236)
- Statue head in the Field Museum of Natural History, Chicago
- Granite head, part of a statue. Petrie Museum of Egyptian Archaeology, London (LDUCE-UC16451)
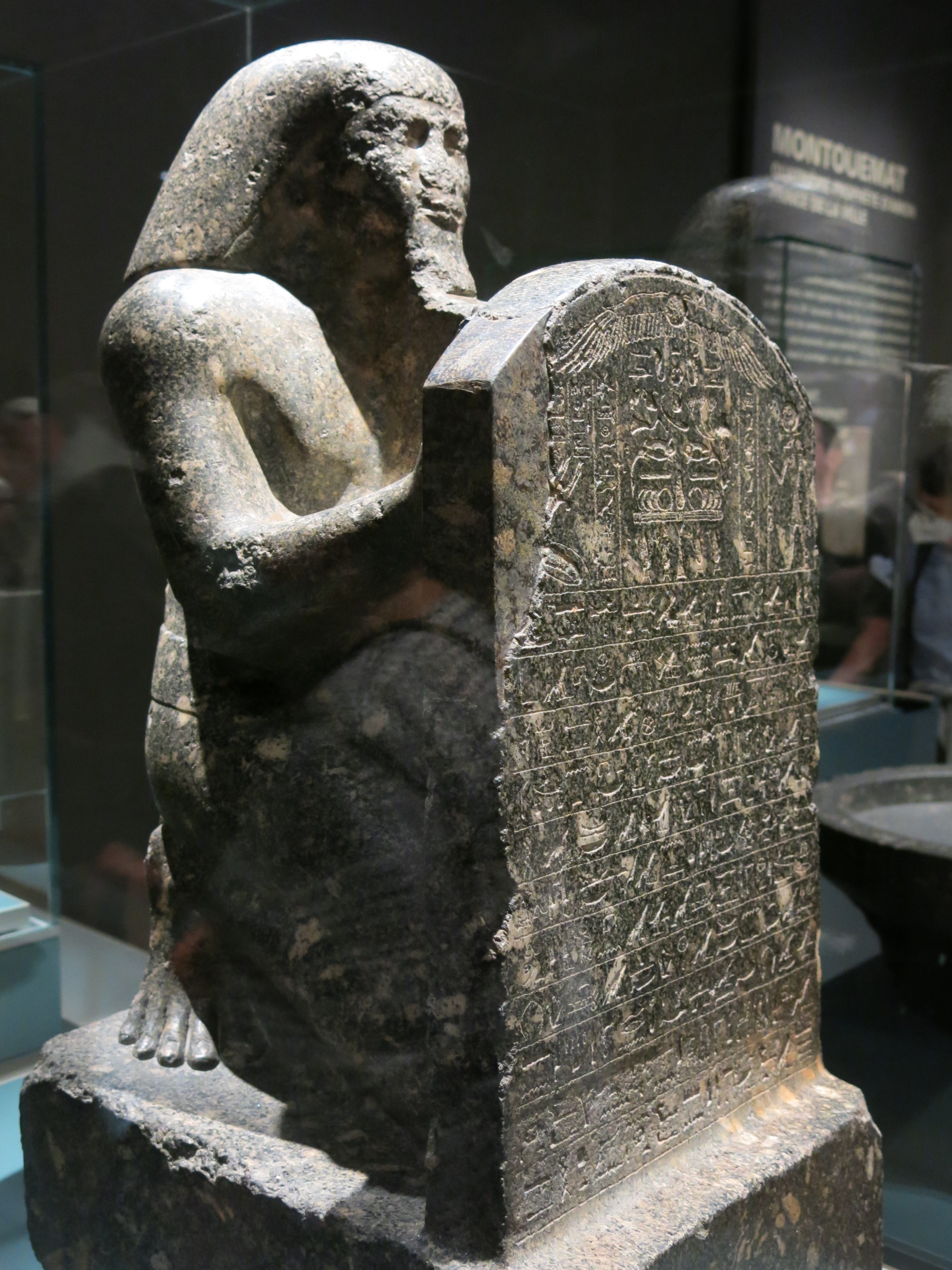
Stele of Mentuemhat in the British Museum

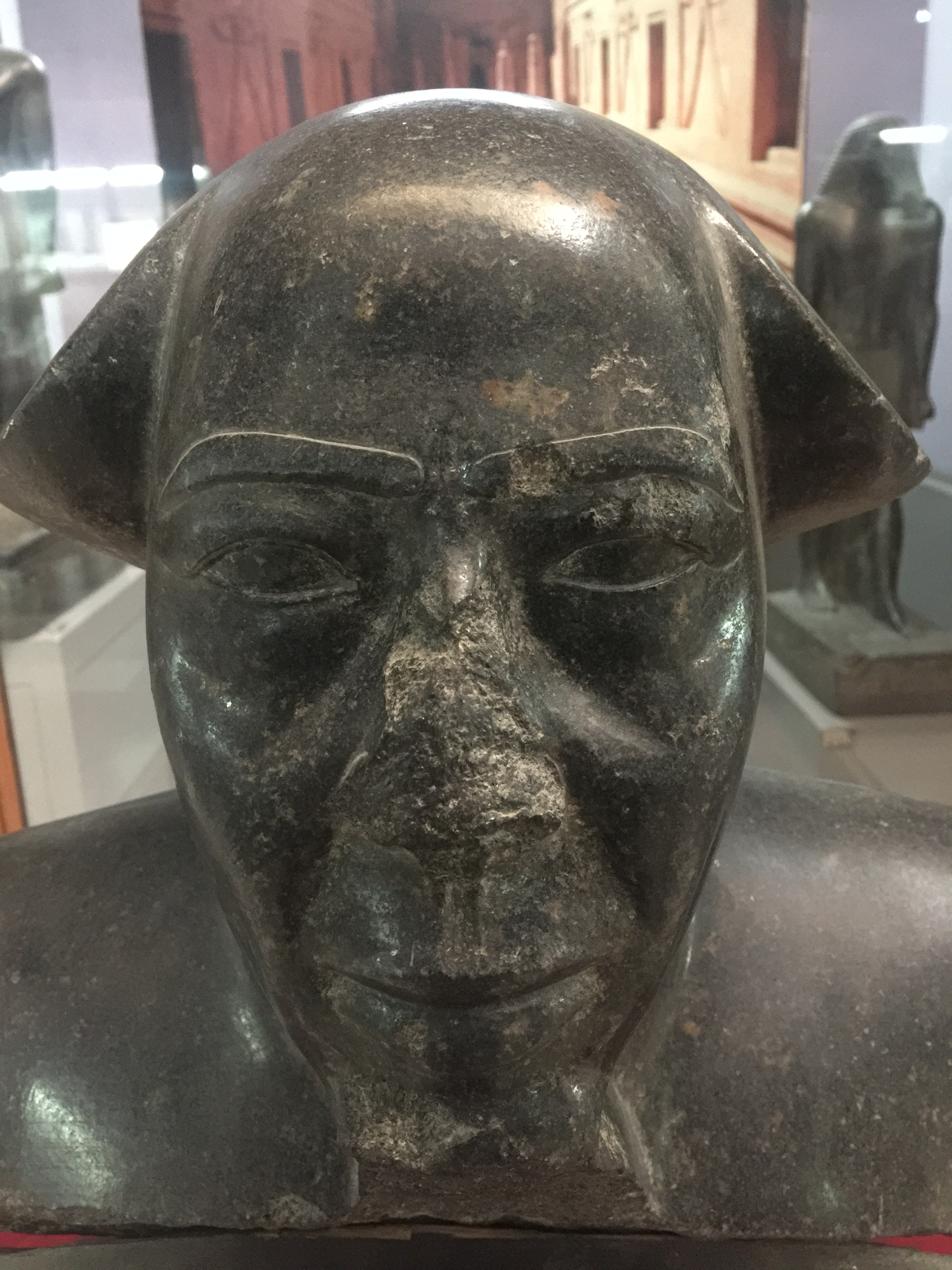
Menteumhat, Thebes. Cairo Museum

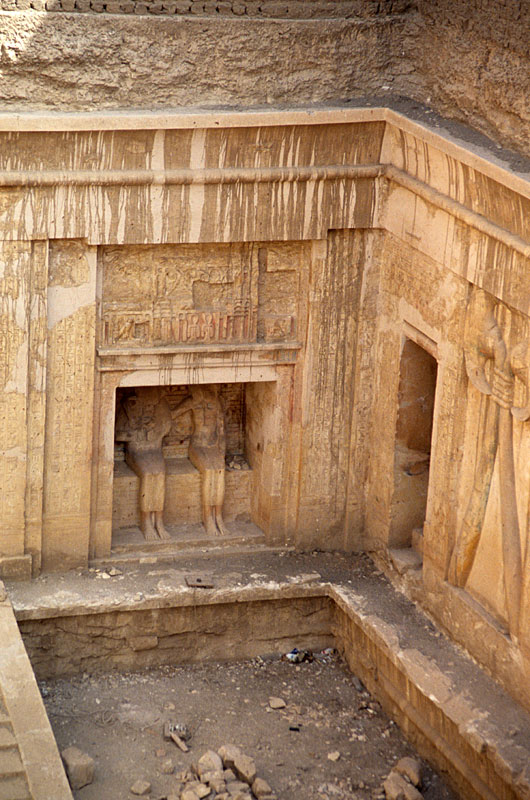
Seated statues of Montuemhet and Wadjerenes in TT34

=== Other ===
- Relief with Anubis in the Nelson-Atkins Museum of Art, Kansas City
- Funerary Cone of Montuemhat, National Museum of Ireland, L1030:74
