= Spine with fluid (hieroglyph) =

Egyptian hieroglyph

F40
Spine
issuing fluid(?)
in hieroglyphs

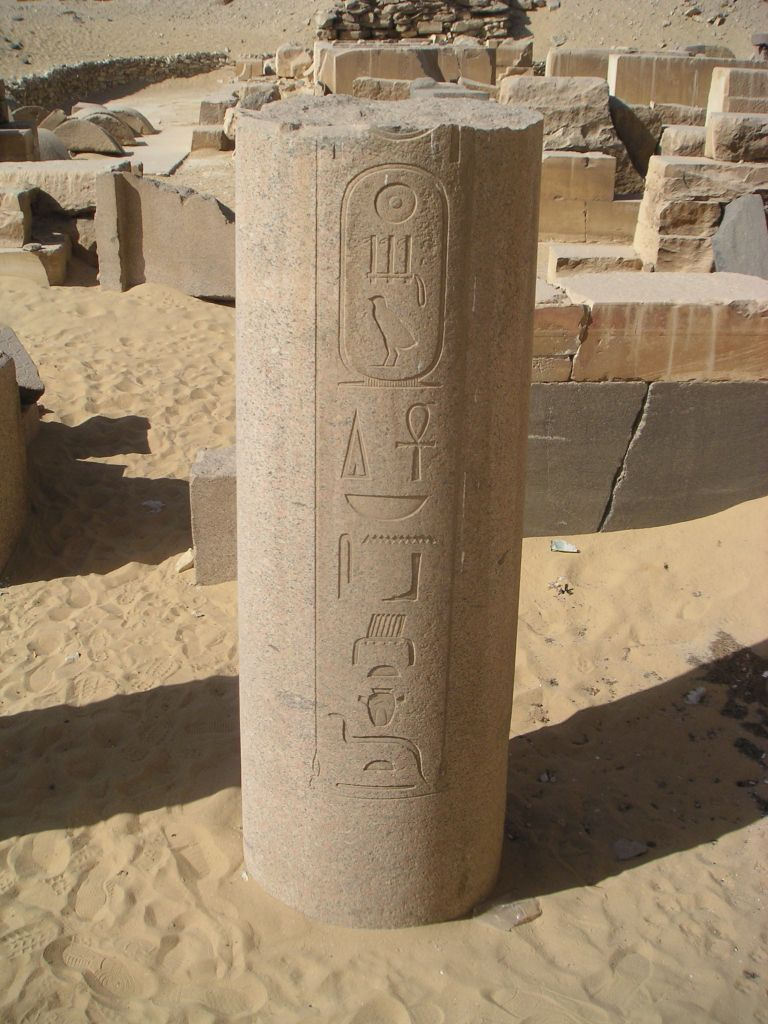
Spine with fluid, stating: "...(pharaoh)-Lord (of) Extent of (the Land's) "Happiness"...." (uses the Heart (hieroglyph))

The ancient Egyptian hieroglyph of a Spine issuing fluid is Gardiner sign listed no. F40 for the animal spine, fluid falling from each end. Another hieroglyph, Gardiner F39 shows only half of the spine,

F39

-(referring to 'dignity', or 'to be revered'). The Spine with fluid hieroglyph is used in Egyptian hieroglyphs as a biliteral with the language value of Aw-(Au) and consists of the Egyptian vowel uniliterals of a, the vulture, Gardiner G1-(birds),

G1

and w, the quail chick, Gardiner G43,

G43

The use of the Spine with fluid hieroglyph is for words showing "length", as opposed to 'breadth', (Egyptian usekh-(breadth, width)-for example, the Usekh collar). Some example words for 'length' are: to be long, length, to extend, extended; and for to expand, to dilate, words like: joy, gladness, pleasure, delight.

Preceded by G1 vulture: a - (unil.); Vulture (hieroglyph) (start of alphabet)	F40 spine with fluid 3w-(3u)	Succeeded by U23 chisel 3b - (phonogram)

== See also ==
- Gardiner's Sign List#F. Parts of Mammals
- List of Egyptian hieroglyphs
