= Bone-with-meat (hieroglyph) =

Egyptian hieroglyph

F44
Bone-with-Meat
in hieroglyphs

The ancient Egyptian Bone-with-meat hieroglyph (Gardiner F44) represented: "ancestry, inherit", and phonetic isw, iw' (inherit, etc.); a determinative for the femur, (iw'); and swt, for the tibia.

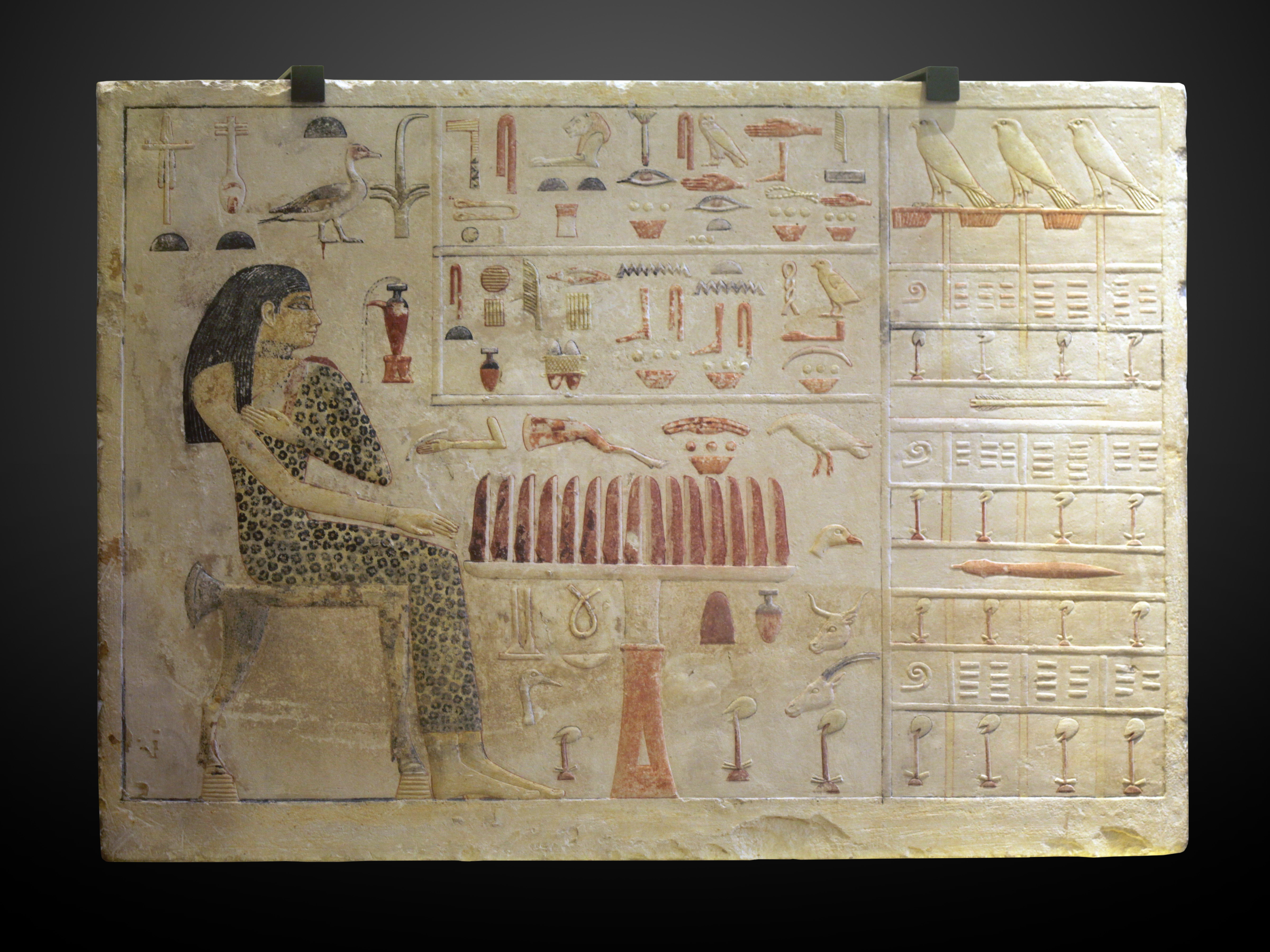
Slab stela of Nefertiabet, with proto-typical form: as a meat section (spare rib-2 curved bones)

The Old Kingdom usage on slab steles, from the middle of the 3rd millennium BC, shows the proto-type form of the hieroglyph as a 'cut of meat', much like the spare ribs or beef ribs of the present era. The slab stela shows the bone as a multiple of two curved bones, much like the spare rib.

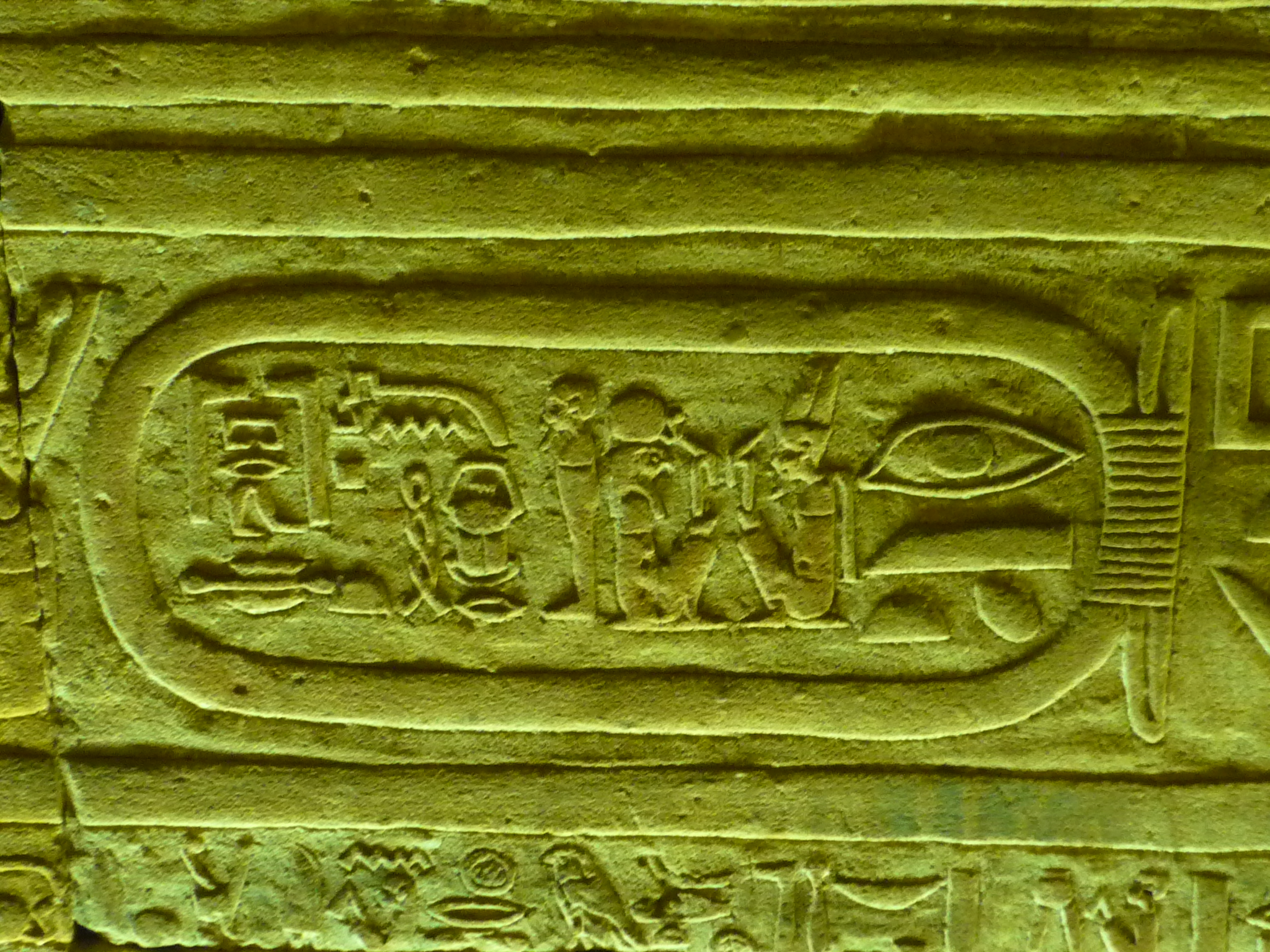
Cartouche relief, Temple of Edfu.

An example of a wall relief scene from Edfu at the Temple of Edfu shows a cartouche with the joint of meat hieroglyph. Another less common hieroglyph pictured within the cartouche is the vertical standing mummy hieroglyph.

== See also ==
- Gardiner's Sign List#F. Parts of Mammals
- List of Egyptian hieroglyphs
