= Elizabeth Cady Stanton Blake =

American painter (1894–1981)

Elizabeth Cady Stanton Blake (December 31, 1894 – November 24, 1981) was an American painter.

== Life and career ==
Blake, granddaughter of Elizabeth Cady Stanton, was born in New York City on December 31, 1894 to Henry S. Stanton and Julia Elliott (Colbath) Stanton. was born in New York City, She enjoyed a comfortable childhood until her father's death in 1906, whereupon the family moved to New Hampshire for a time. They next moved to Jamaica Plain, Massachusetts, where she finished her schooling. Due to poor health she was forced to forego college, enrolling instead at the Knox School, where she developed a passion for art that took her to the Art Students League of New York. Among her instructors were George Bridgman, F. Luis Mora, Albert Sterner, and Cecilia Beaux, with whom she would go on to develop a close relationship.

In 1925, she met William Harold Blake, whom she married on March 26, 1927; she gave up her career painting portraits on her marriage. The couple had one child, a daughter, Elizabeth Stanton "Bettina" Blake (born 1929). William Blake headed the English Department of the Horace Mann School, and this allowed his wife to find opportunities for involvement at Columbia University and other organizations of the surrounding community; she continued to be active as a volunteer until the mid-1970s, when her age forced her to curtail her activities. She died in 1981, aged 86.

Blake was a member during her career of the American Federation of Arts, the National Association of Women Painters and Sculptors, and the Tiffany Foundation. A collection of her papers is held by Columbia University, while other papers were donated by her daughter to the Archives of American Art at the Smithsonian Institution.

An award given by the National Association of Women Artists bears her name.
