= Quadrat (hieroglyph block) =

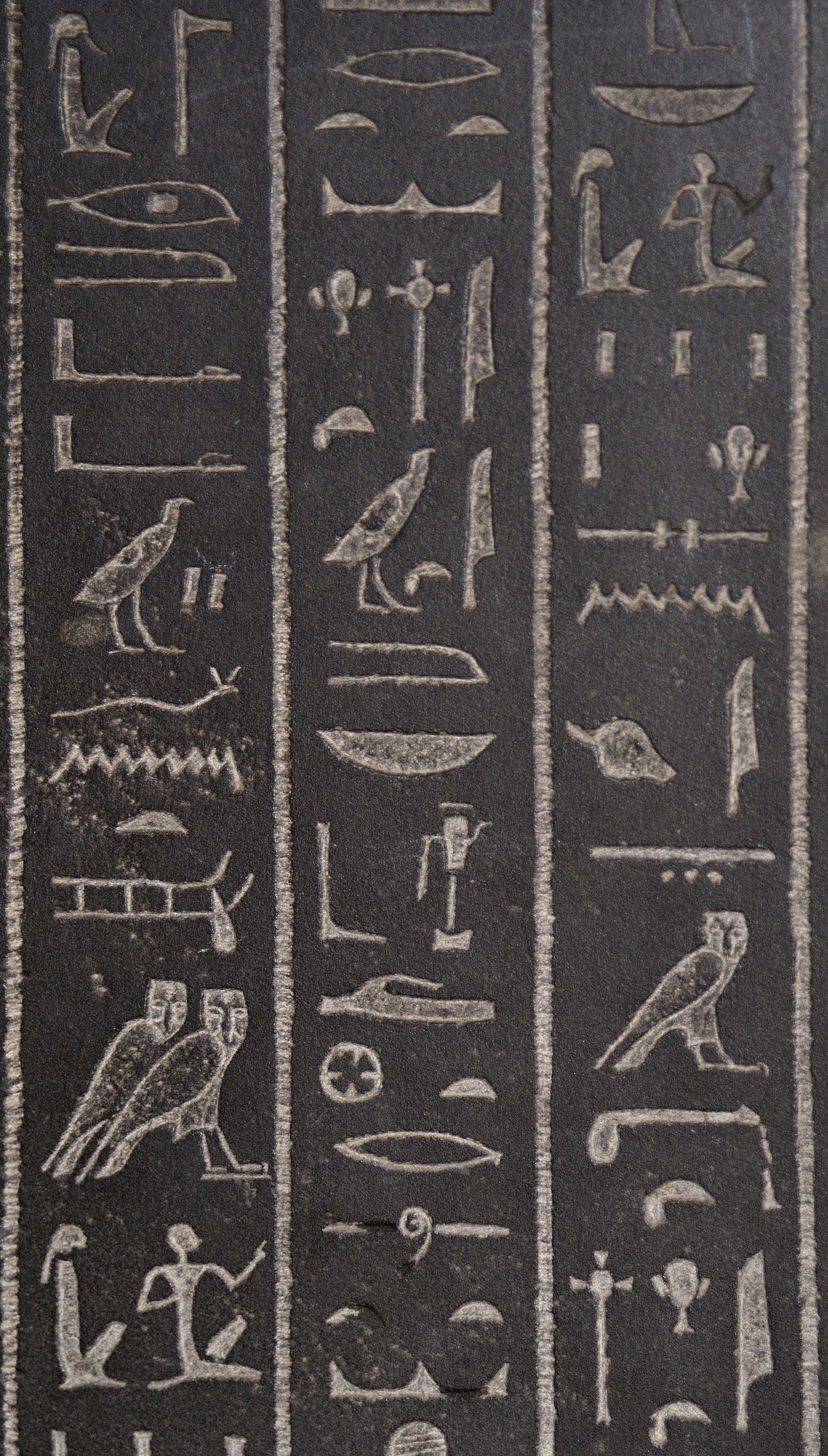
Ankhnesneferibre's coffin lid. The glyphs read into the facing of the hieroglyphs, as column 3, 2, then 1. Column 1 ends at the bottom with a hieroglyph block of "people", i.e. "man, woman, plural" (3 vertical strokes).A1 B1 Z1 Z1 Z1

A quadrat block (or quadrate block) is a virtual rectangle or square in Egyptian hieroglyphic text.

The glyphs (hieroglyphs) can be variable in number within the virtual block, though they are often proportioned according to variable standardized rules of scribal methods.

The definition for the block in Illustrated Hieroglyphics Handbook by Schumann-Antelme and Rossini, is: "A 'quadrate' is a virtual square, which although not drawn, guides the hand of the scribe. Hieroglyphs must be aesthetically positioned within the quadrate and their size must be proportioned accordingly. They form groups that are pleasing to the eye and based on the laws of balance."

== Rosetta Stone closeup ==
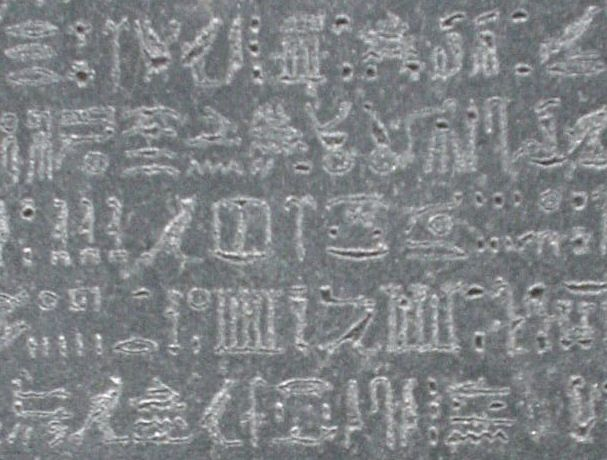
Section of lines 9 through 13, Rosetta Stone.

An example of five lines of text from the Rosetta Stone, (lines 9, 10, 11, 12, 13), shows a width of about six to seven virtual blocks. Line 12, (fourth line) is illustrative of the variable size, in this case the widths, of the 'virtual quadrate blocks'.

The time of the festivals are stated as: "...day 1 up to day 5...", (three blocks)

N5 Z1
nfr t D21
O4 N5 Z1 Z1 Z1 Z1 Z1

The three blocks:

N5 Z1 nfr t D21 O4 N5 Z1 Z1 Z1 Z1 Z1
In running text blocks, prepositions can sometimes start or end a block, but may be part of the next block's translation. Running texts will sometimes actually end in the very middle of the next square. This can be accomplished because some of the prepositions come in vertical and horizontal forms: O34 s, M m, N n

(See: N-red crown (n hieroglyph), N-water ripple (n hieroglyph))

== Amun-Ra's block ==
Most commonly in hieroglyphs, Amun is referenced without Amun-Ra. The two blocks for Amun and Amun-Ra are: M17 Y5 N35, (or M17 Y5 N35 ), and i Y5 N35 N5 Z1

. Note how the vertical hieroglyph for reed-(the i for 'Amun') is actually part of the block, though at its side.

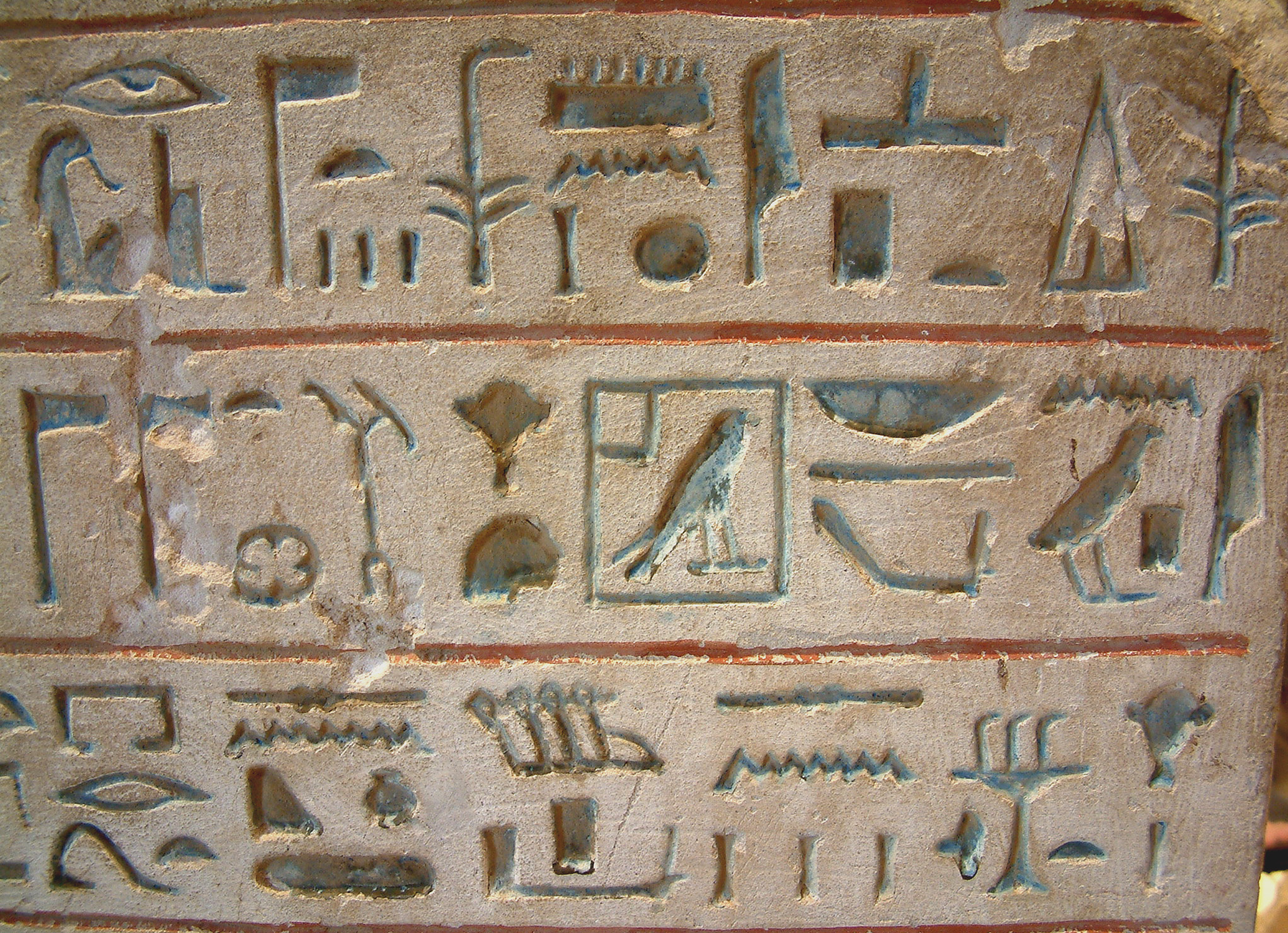
Register 1, (line 1, right to left), blocks 2 and 3:
Hotep, "Amun-Ra"
(htp-t-p, i-mn-n-Ra-(stroke)

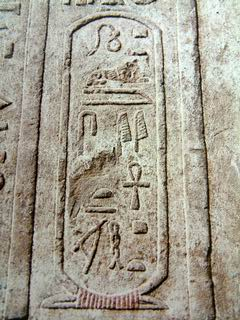
A Ptolemy, cartouche with various quadrate blocks.

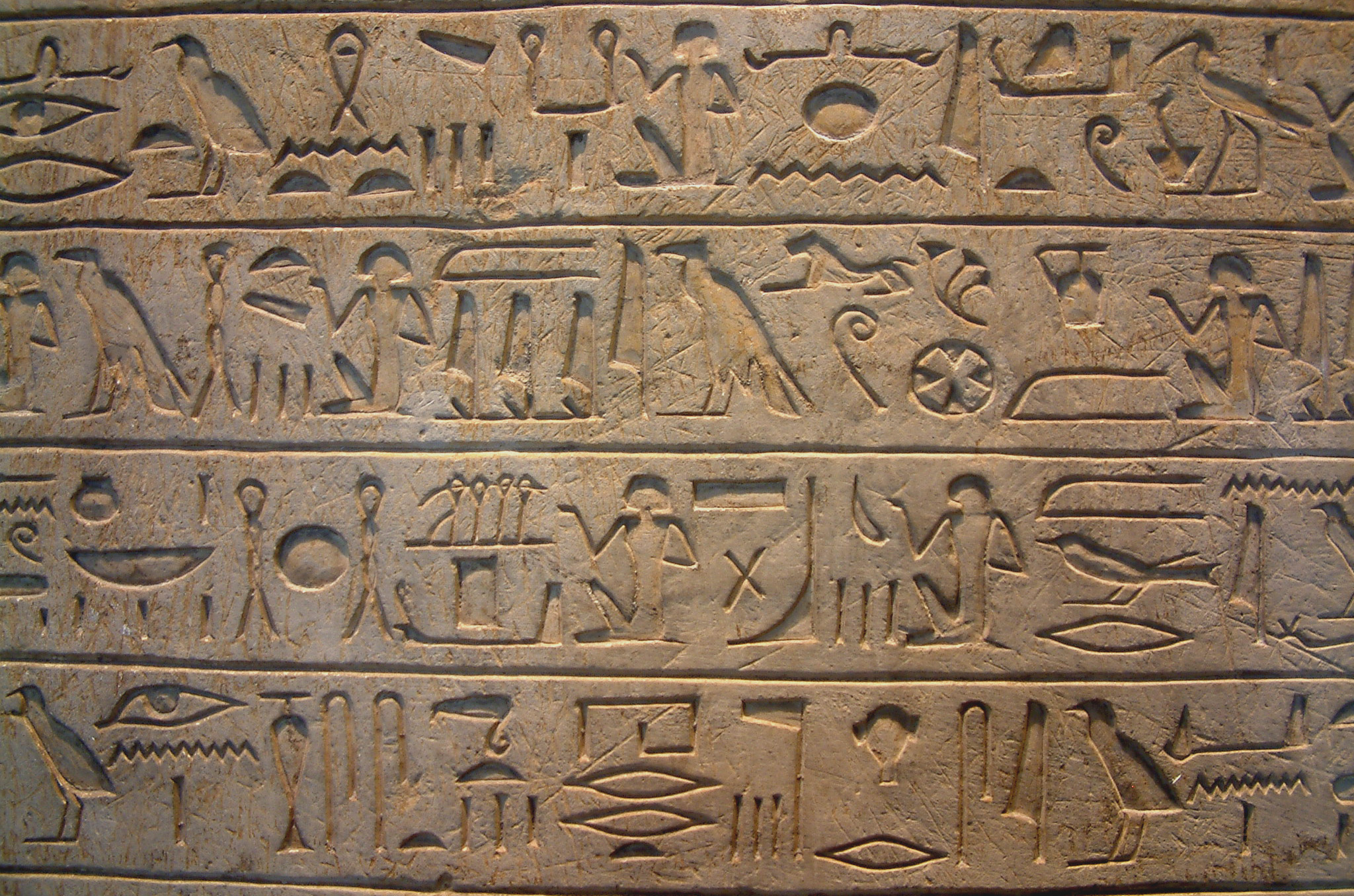
Finely executed hieroglyphs in sunken relief. Line 3, 2nd block in (from left), the H-Ra-H block

== See also ==
- Egyptian hieroglyphs
- Egyptian Hieroglyph Format Controls (Unicode block)
