= Block statue =

Egyptian Middle Kingdom memorial statue

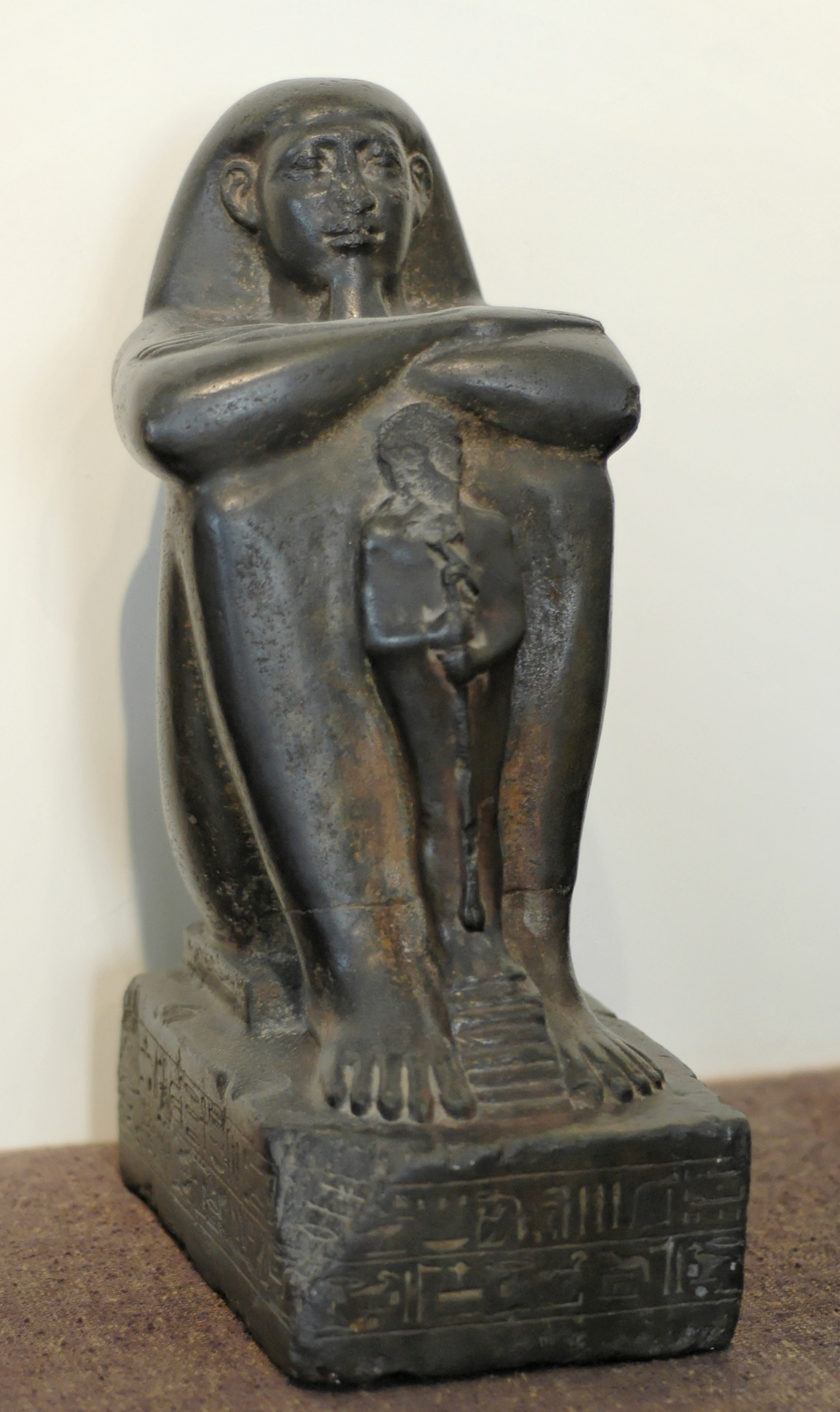
Block-statue of Pa-Ankh-Ra, ship master, bearing a statue of Ptah. Late Period, ca. 650–633 BC, Cabinet des Médailles.

The block statue is a type of memorial statue that first emerged in the Middle Kingdom of Egypt. The block statue grew in popularity in the New Kingdom and the Third Intermediate Period, and by the Late Period, this type of statue was the most common. These statues were used in temples typically as funerary monuments of non-royal yet important individuals. According to primary sources from the New Kingdom, the posture of the statue was possibly intended to resemble a guardian seated in the gateway of a temple. In addition, their simple shape provided ample flat surfaces for inscriptions of offerings and invocations.

Block statues consist of a man squatting with his knees drawn up to his chest and his arms folded on top his knees. Often, these men are wearing a "wide cloak" that reduces the body of the figure to a simple block-like shape. Most of the detail is reserved for the head of the individual being depicted. In some instances the modeling of the limbs has been retained by the sculptor. There are two basic types of block statues: ones with the feet completely covered by the cloak and ones with the feet uncovered.

In 1903, more than 350 block statues were discovered by the French archaeologist Georges Legrain as part of the "Karnak cachette".

== History of the Egyptian block statue ==
In Egypt, statues of the seated scribe appear as long ago as the 1st Dynasty. Seated scribe statues evolved over time and some also came to incorporate, Thoth, or the baboon (as the scribal god), into the statue presentation. So, also the complexities of the block statue developed, and evolved. Combinational themes became common, and likewise abbreviated, (simpler, and less costly, – detailed), also developed.

Examples of the statue for Senemut, of Queen Hatshepsut's reign, have extensive stories in hieroglyphs. They also have the added head of the child Neferure upon the top surface. They are finely executed, in a medium or high finish. As an example of the Block statue, Senemut's is one of the typical types:

a story of the honored individual on the front surface;
a presentation of the individual, in statue form (in this case with an additional, lesser individual);
a theme. For Senemut, his theme appears to be: His honoring, His personal story, and the lesser individual, who was his responsibility.

== Historical magic: the seated statue "stands up" ==
Since the Egyptian belief system contained concepts framed in a world of magic and a formal framework of art expression, the block statue had a magical purpose. Obviously ideas evolved, but eventually the idea came for the statue that it was always – seated in place, and at a moments notice, the individual could stand erect and "go out into the day." This concept is quite similar to the Book of the Dead, where the individual is:

returning, and entering..(to/from cemetery Neter-Khert)..the daily returning for events wonderful, to the loved, created habits, (all), sitting in the Hall, Senet-playing... returning as a living-soul (Ba), Chapter VII, lines 1-3.5. (The Book of the Dead, subtitle: The Coming Forth by Day.)

The deceased individual Egyptian person returns each day, to perform their usual daily life duties. It is also equivalent to the earlier concept of the false door, where the ba-soul returned each day, to find the food offering.

== Block statue: examples ==
R8 U36 T8 S3 M17 Y5 N35 V31 G29 N35 Aa1 N35 M23
God's Priest[top/1st] for Amun — BakenKhonsu
in hieroglyphs
Era: New Kingdom
(1550–1069 BC)

The following examples are found in the Ref. Section that follows:

- Block statue for Bakenkhonsu, (Bak, eN, Chons, nsu), who was "High Priest of Amun", for Ramesses II, who possibly usurped this block statue. See Ramses II Ref.
- Block statue of Satepihu, from Abydos, 18th Dynasty. Extensive hieroglyphs: horizontal, front; vertical columns on sides. See Wilkinson Ref., pg 30.

O21 O18
Common – shaped
shrine-(frontal) --- or Naos-(side)
in hieroglyphs

- Block statue for the scribe Rey. A lesser statue; it has few hieroglyphs, but the front surface has him holding a sistraform shrine (a naos).
- Block statue of Vizier Khay, Karnak, 19th Dynasty. This Block statue fuses the form of the Block statue with that of "shrine" (Shrine #1, Upper Egyptian Shrine). The lintel base, has a single row of hieroglyphs, that extend to the left and to the right (starting at front, center).
- Block statue of 12th Dynasty official, Senwosret-senebefni, in medium brown quartzite. Originally the statue was brought to France by Napoleon, in 1799; it is now located at the Brooklyn Museum. The statue has an extensive hieroglyphic story, and a lesser statue of his wife at the front, base. See Reeves Ref., pg. 14.
- Block statue of Senemut and Princess Neferure, Queen Hatshepsut's daughter, –New Kingdom, 18th Dynasty, height 1.005 m, medium to deep black granite, high to extreme polish. Extensive hieroglyphic story: sides, front, top, and the tops of feet, at front base. (Front: 7 horizontal 'registers', and 6 vertical to the feet.) See Hagen Ref., pg. 60.
- Block statue of Amenemhet, Amenemhat II (?), –18th Dynasty, height 0.8 m, dk granite, high polish. Front: eight (8) horizontal registers of hieroglyphs. See Hagen Ref., pg 101.
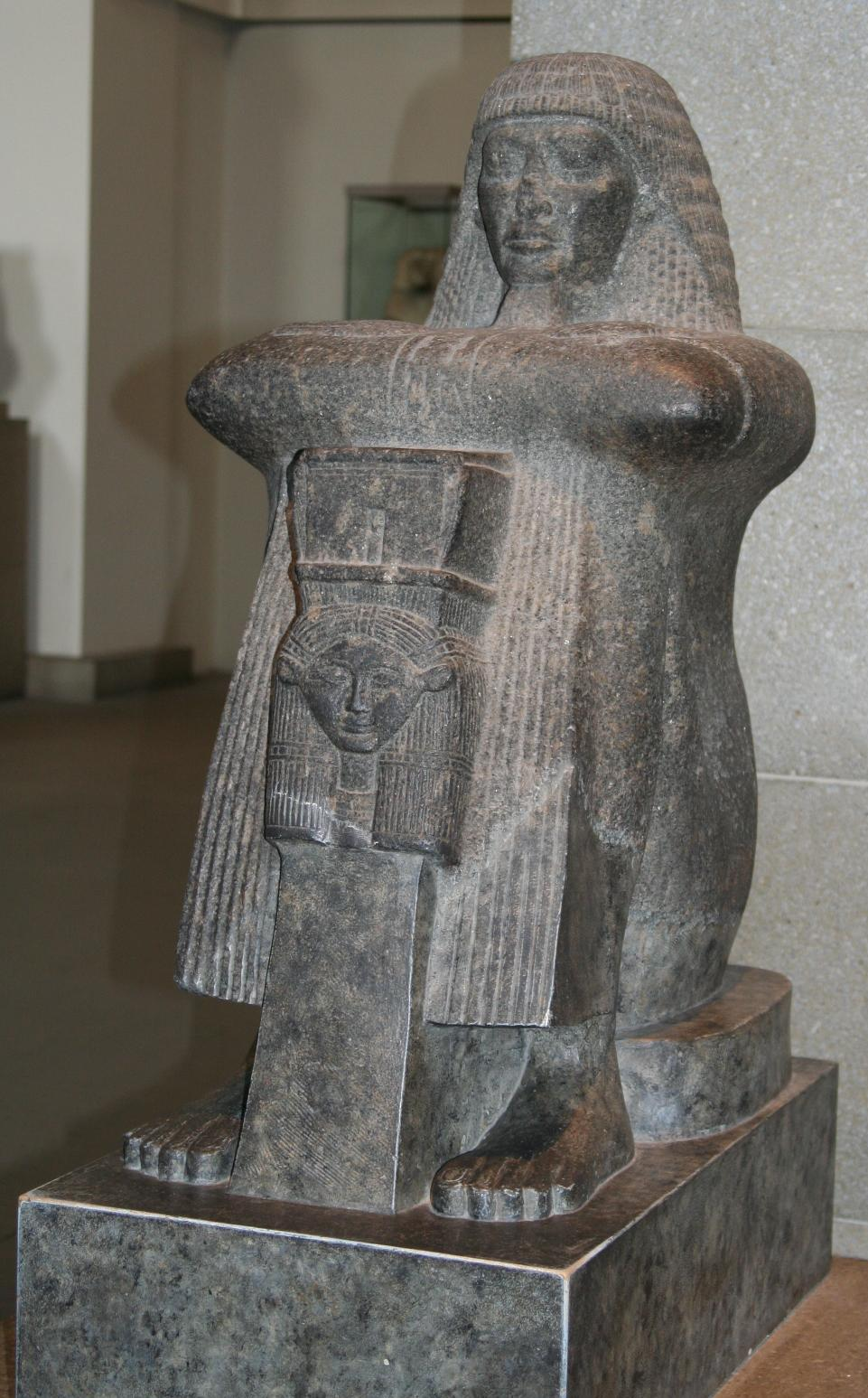
Statue of a scribe, British Museum

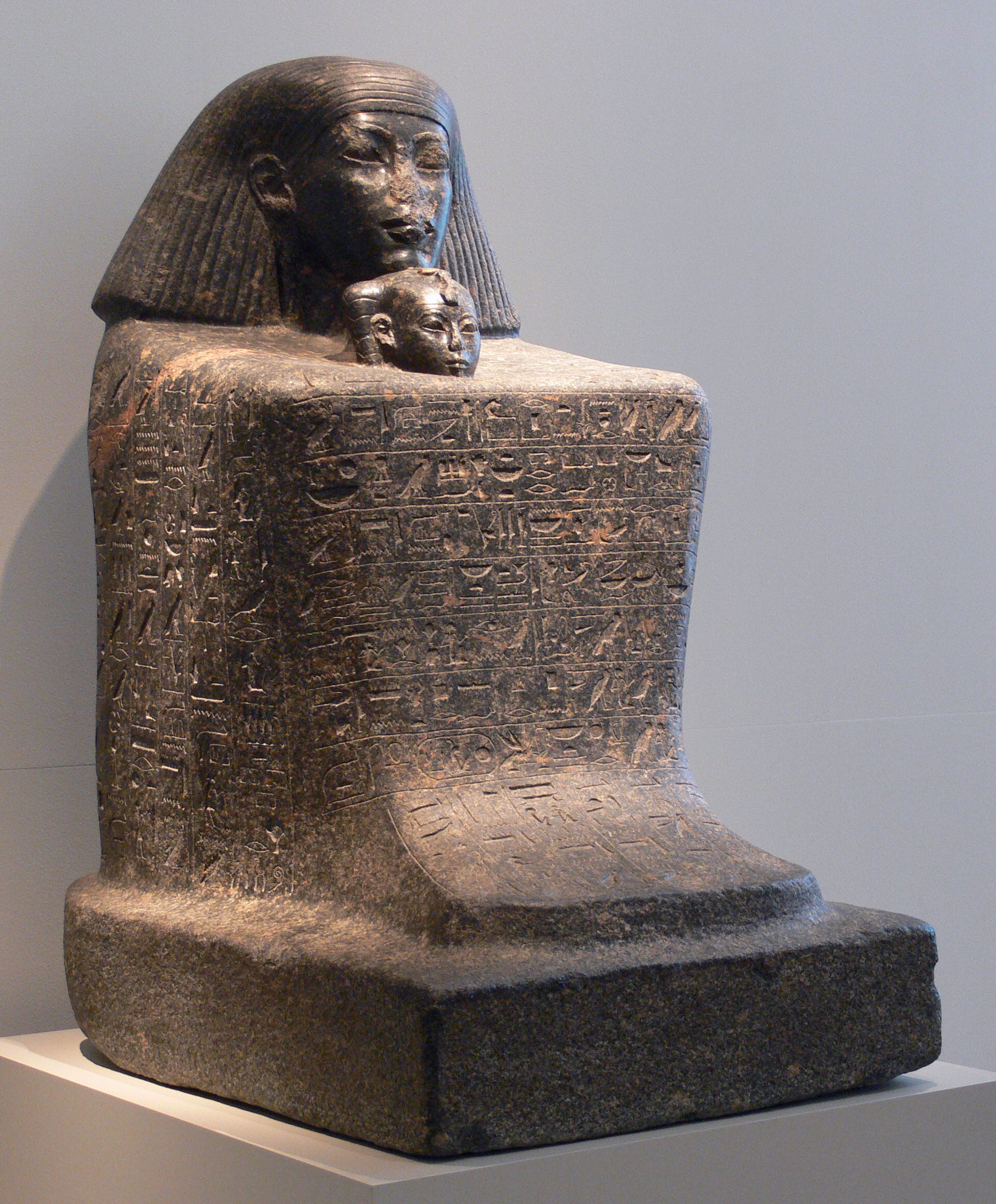
Senemut

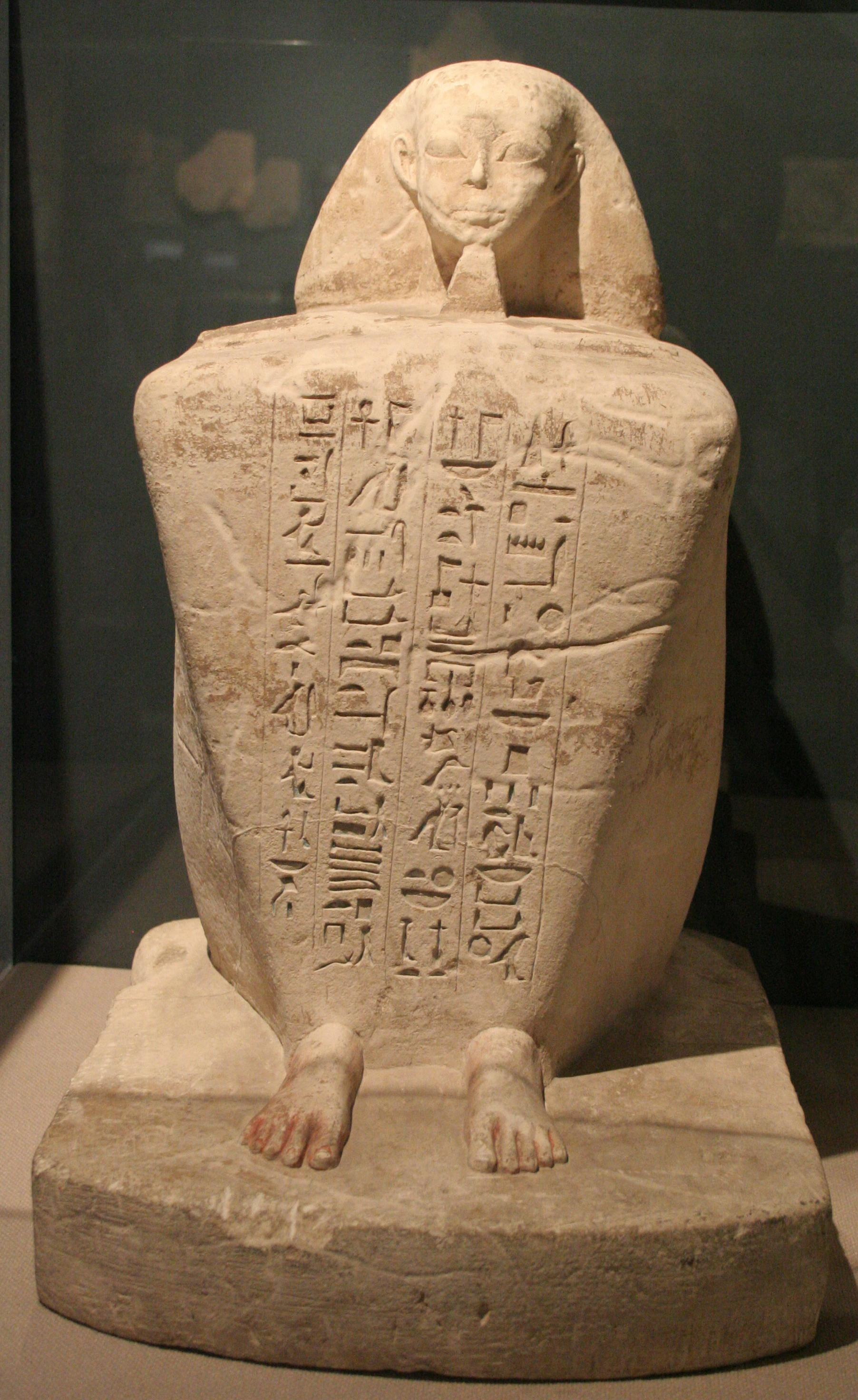
18th dynasty

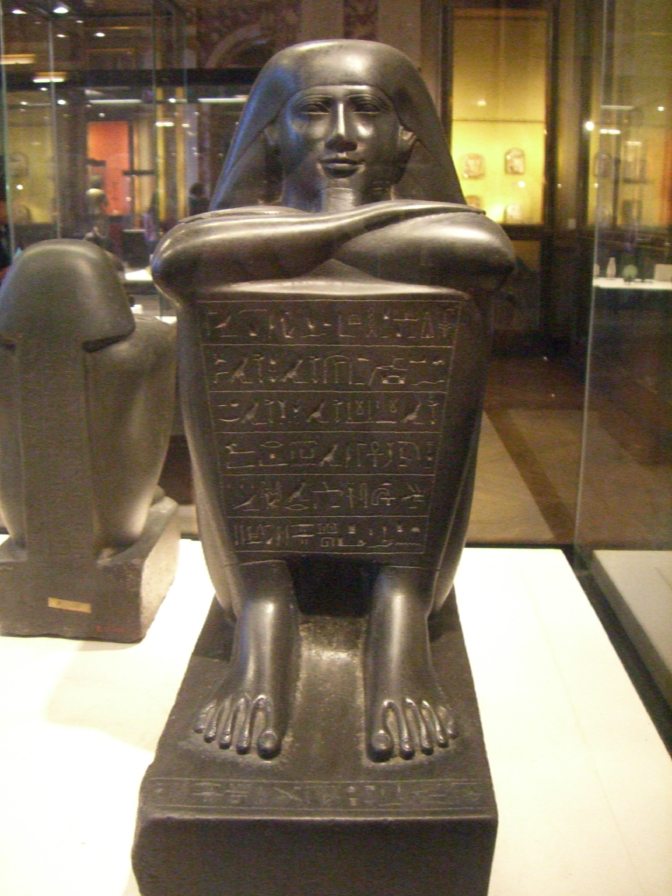
A 26th dynasty army general, Pa-di-Chahdedet

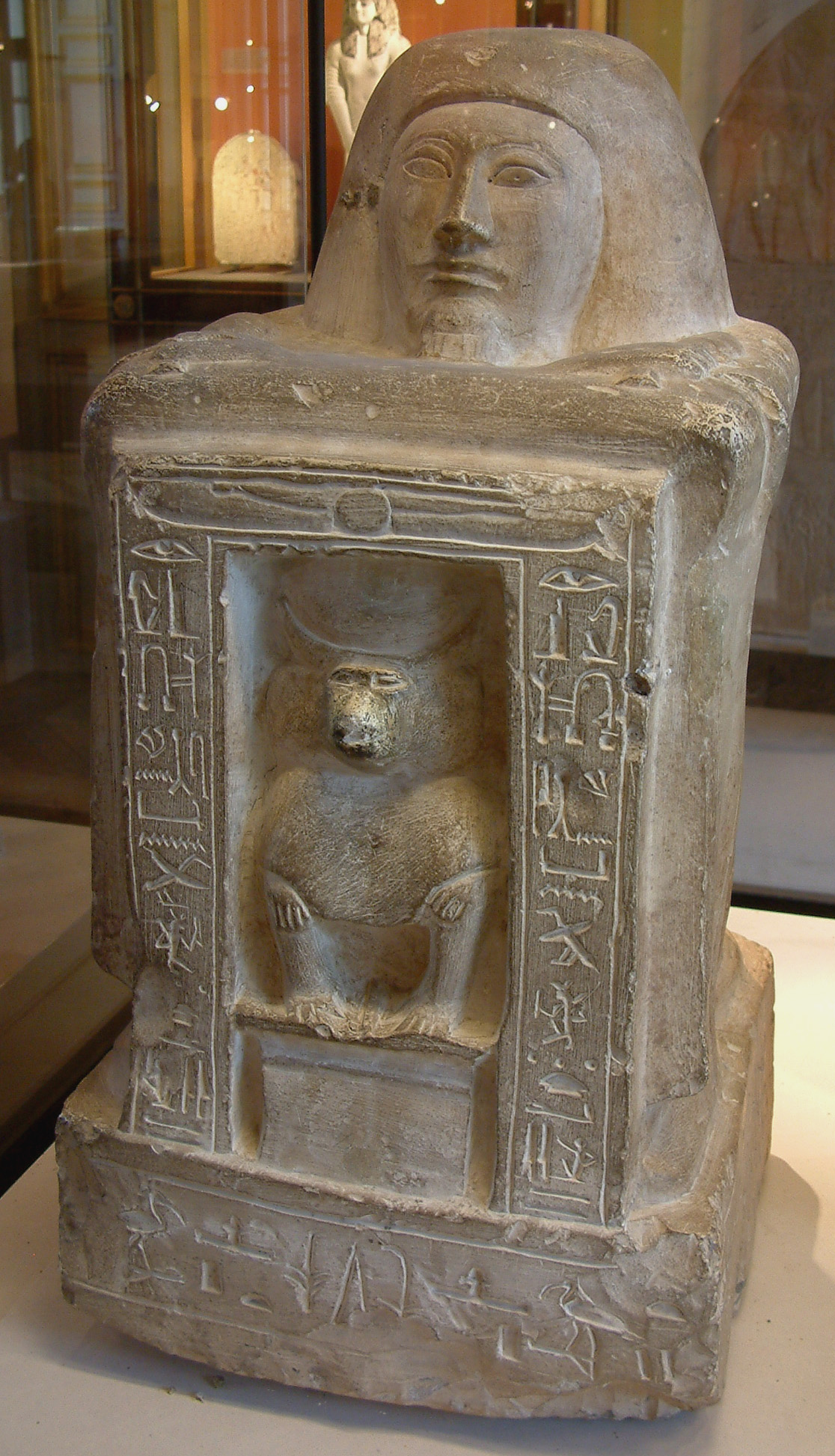
Block statue for Khay, Scribe for the general staff, showing titulary god of the scribe, Thoth-(a baboon)

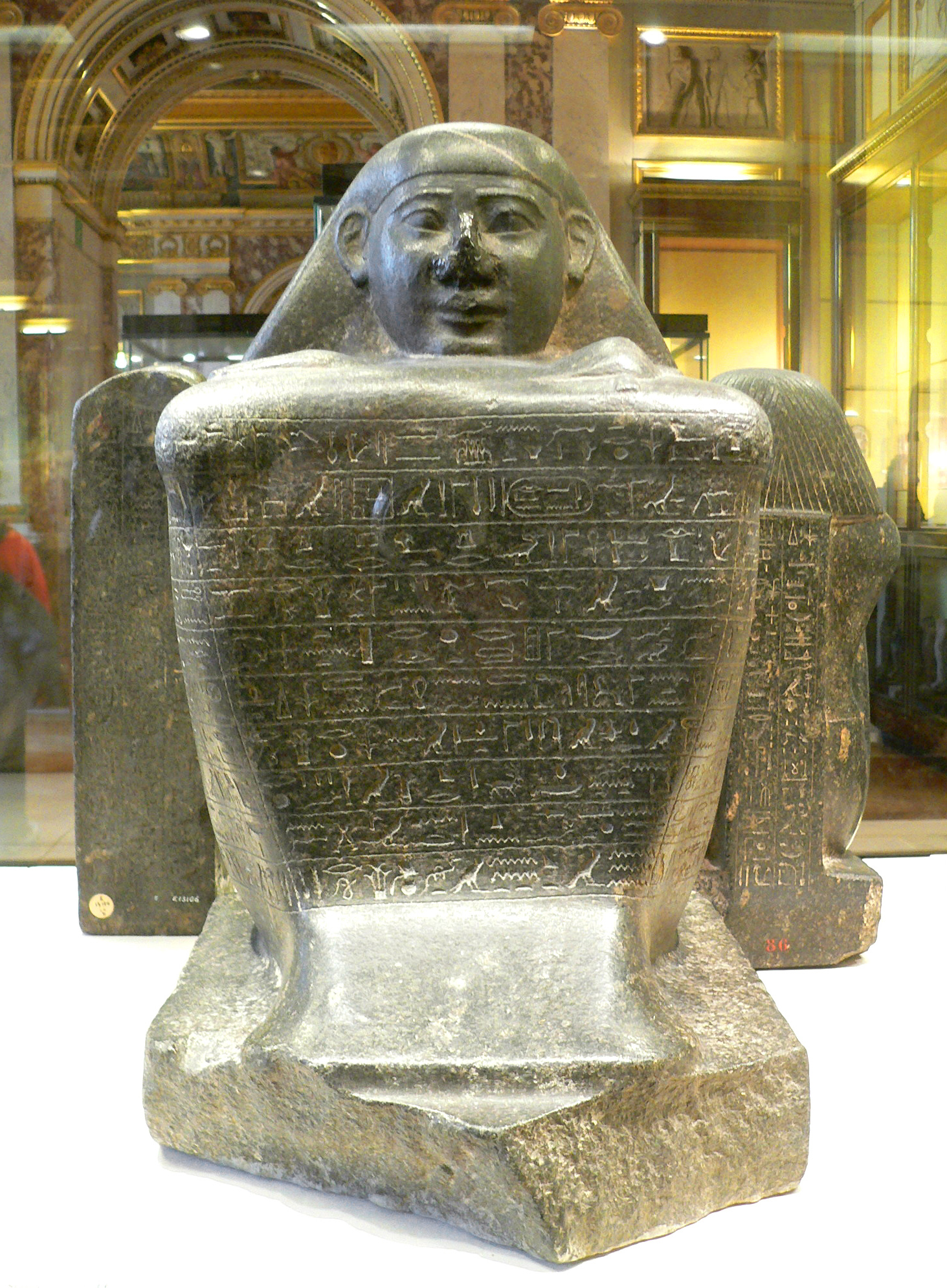
Harwa, attendant to the Divine Adoratrice of Amun, Amenirdis I

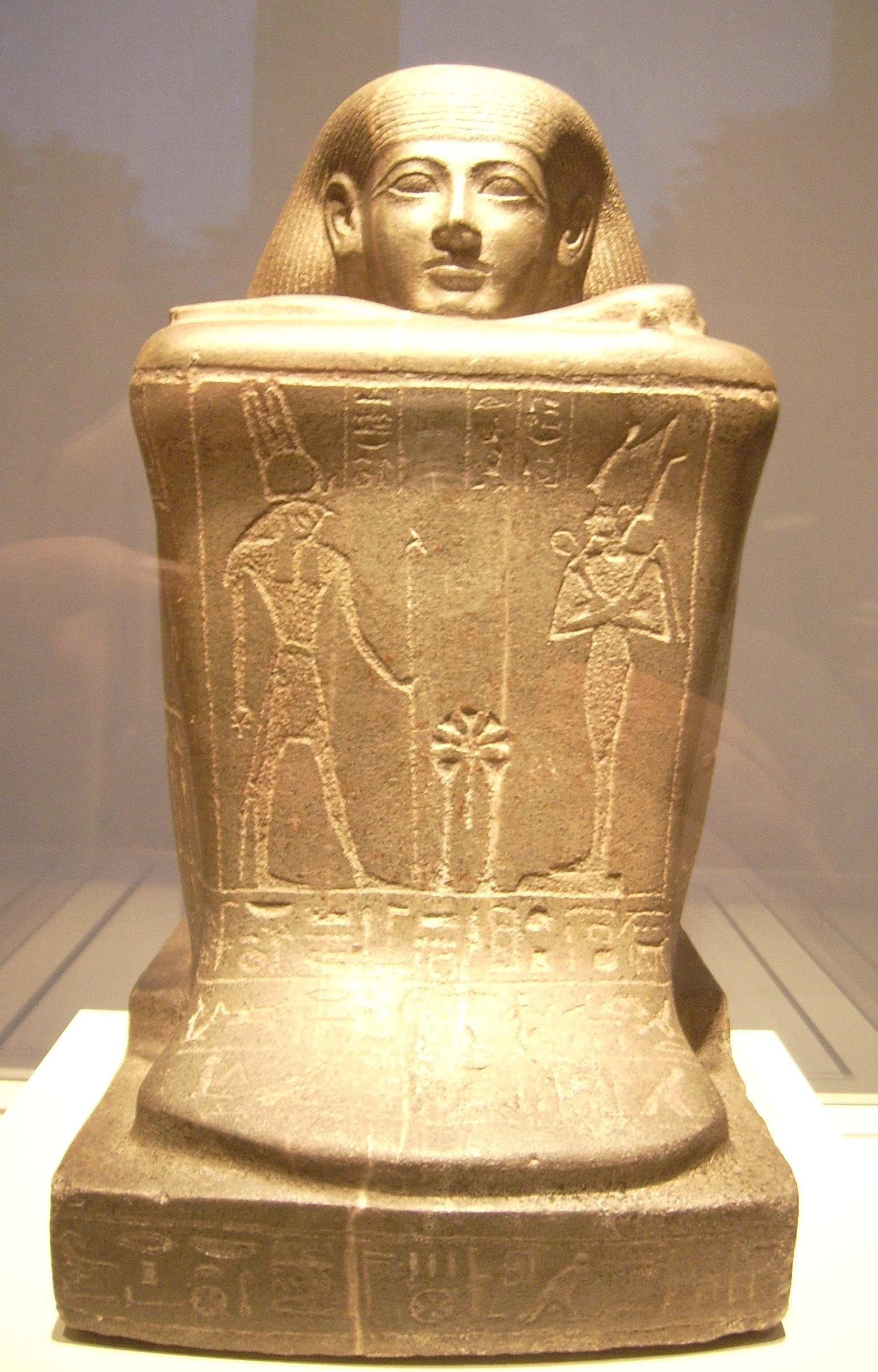
Block statue made from greywacke, 23rd Dynasty, 775 BC

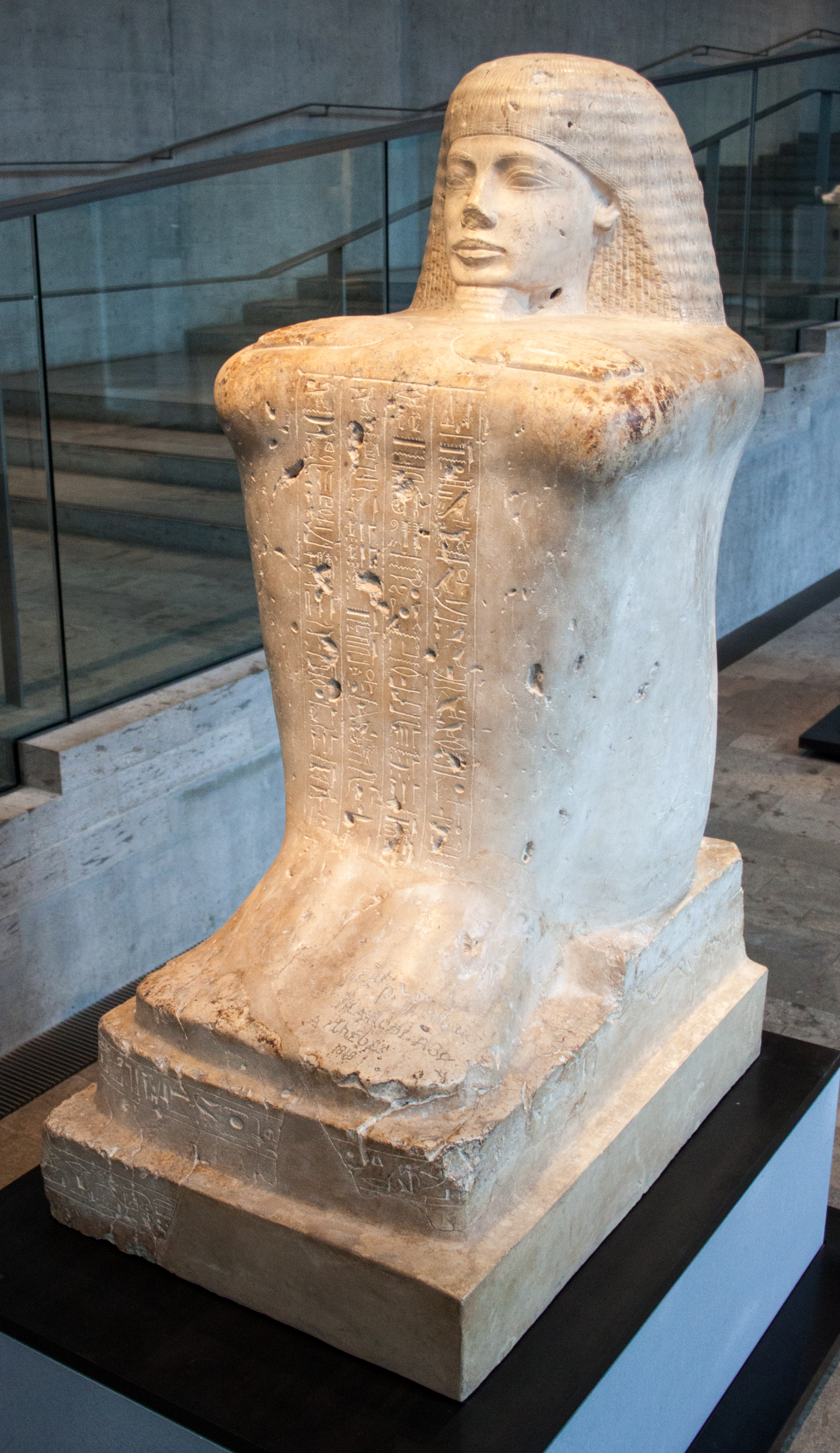
Block statue of Bakenkhonsu

=== Block statue: (photos) ===
- Image, Article; BlkStatue: Ruiu
- Block Statue of Senemut; Article, see: Senemut
