= List of Egyptian hieroglyphs =

The total number of distinct Egyptian hieroglyphs increased over time from several hundred in the Middle Kingdom to several thousand during the Ptolemaic Kingdom.

In 1928/1929 Alan Gardiner published an overview of hieroglyphs, Gardiner's sign list, the basic modern standard. It describes 763 signs in 26 categories (A–Z, roughly). Georg Möller compiled more extensive lists, organized by historical epoch (published posthumously in 1927 and 1936).

In Unicode, the block Egyptian Hieroglyphs (2009) includes 1071 signs, organization based on Gardiner's list. As of 2016, there is a proposal by Michael Everson to extend the Unicode standard to comprise Möller's list. Further hieroglyphs, including Ptolemaic variants, are encoded in Egyptian Hieroglyphs Extended-A.

== Subsets ==
Notable subsets of hieroglyphs:

- Determinatives
- Uniliteral signs
- Biliteral signs
- Triliteral signs
- Egyptian numerals

== Letter classification by Gardiner ==
Gardiner's sign list letter classification
Letter	Description	Category (individual hieroglyph articles)
A	§ Man and his occupations	Category:Egyptian hieroglyphs: man and his occupations (4)
B	§ Woman and her occupations	Category:Egyptian hieroglyphs: woman and her occupations (0)
C	§ Anthropomorphic deities	Category:Egyptian hieroglyphs: anthropomorphic deities (0)
D	§ Parts of the human body	Category:Egyptian hieroglyphs: parts of the human body (13)
E	§ Mammals	Category:Egyptian hieroglyphs: mammals (9)
F	§ Parts of mammals	Category:Egyptian hieroglyphs: parts of mammals (8)
G	§ Birds	Category:Egyptian hieroglyphs: birds (8)
H	§ Parts of birds	Category:Egyptian hieroglyphs: parts of birds (1)
I	§ Amphibious animals, reptiles, etc.	Category:Egyptian hieroglyphs: amphibious-animals-reptiles-etc (4)
K	§ Fishes and parts of fishes	Category:Egyptian hieroglyphs: fishes and parts of fishes (0)
L	§ Invertebrata and lesser animals	Category:Egyptian hieroglyphs: invertebrates and lesser animals (3)
M	§ Trees and plants	Category:Egyptian hieroglyphs: trees and plants (6)
N	§ Sky, earth, water	Category:Egyptian hieroglyphs: sky-earth-water (16)
NU	§ Upper nile	Category:Egyptian hieroglyphs by category (27)
NL	§ Lower nile	Category:Egyptian hieroglyphs by category (27)
O	§ Buildings, parts of buildings, etc.	Category:Egyptian hieroglyphs: buildings and parts-of-buildings-etc (12)
P	§ Ships and parts of ships	Category:Egyptian hieroglyphs: ships and parts of ships (2)
Q	§ Domestic and funerary furniture	Category:Egyptian hieroglyphs: domestic and funerary furniture (2)
R	§ Temple furniture and sacred emblems	Category:Egyptian hieroglyphs: temple furniture and emblems (7)
S	§ Crowns, dress, staves, etc.	Category:Egyptian hieroglyphs: crowns-dress-staves (14)
T	§ Warfare, hunting, butchery	Category:Egyptian hieroglyphs: warfare-hunting-butchery (4)
U	§ Agriculture, crafts, and professions	Category:Egyptian hieroglyphs: agriculture-crafts-and-professions (5)
V	§ Rope, fibre, baskets, bags, etc.	Category:Egyptian hieroglyphs: rope-fiber-baskets-bags (11)
W	§ Vessels of stone and earthenware	Category:Egyptian hieroglyphs: vessels of stone and earthenware (4)
X	§ Loaves and cakes	Category:Egyptian hieroglyphs: loaves and cakes (3)
Y	§ Writings, games, music	Category:Egyptian hieroglyphs: writings-games-music (5)
Z	§ Strokes, signs derived from Hieratic, geometrical features	Category:Egyptian hieroglyphs: strokes, signs derived from Hieratic, geometrical features (0)
Aa	§ Unclassified signs	Category:Egyptian hieroglyphs: unclassified (7)

== List of hieroglyphs ==
List of Egyptian hieroglyphs
Hieroglyph	Gardiner Unicode	Description	Ideogram	Phonogram	Notes
	A		Man and his occupations		
𓀀	A1; U+13000	seated man	I, me, my (masculine) (.j); man (z)		Determinative for masculine names
𓀁	A2; U+13001	man with hand to mouth	eat (wnm); drink (zwr); speak, think, recount (sḏd); refrain from speech, be(come) silent (gr); plan, plot (kꜣj); love (mrj)		Determinative for activities involving the mouth, head, or ideas
𓀂	A3; U+13002	man sitting on heel	sit, besiege, dwell (ḥmsj)		
𓀃	A4; U+13003	seated man with hands raised	offer, praise, beseech (dwꜣ); hide, conceal (jmn)		
𓀄	A5; U+13004	crouching man hiding behind wall	hide (jmn)		Determinative for words relating to concealing, secret, mysterious
𓀅	A5A; U+13005	seated man hiding behind wall	hide (jmn)		
𓀆	A6; U+13006	seated man under vase from which water flows	to be clean (wꜤb)		Possibly refers to all aspects of 'clean' dependent on context, i.e. 'cleanliness', 'to cleanse', 'purify', etc.
𓀇	A6A; U+13007	seated man reaching for libation stone, under vase from which water flows	to be clean (wꜤb)		
𓀈	A6B; U+13008	seated man reaching down, under vase from which water flows	to be clean (wꜤb)		
𓀉	A7; U+13009	fatigued man	to be tired or weak (wrḏ)		
𓀊	A8; U+1300A	man performing hnw-rite	rejoice, celebrate, to be jubilant (hnw)		Possibly also 'joyful', 'celebratory', etc.
𓀋	A9; U+1300B	man steadying basket on head	work, toil (kꜣt); load (verb or noun), burden (ꜣdp); carry, haul (fꜣj)	f, .f (Ptolemaic, from fꜣj)	1a. to load, to be laden, master of the load; equals Coptic language, ⲱⲧⲡ; (minor use for ꜣtp, ꜣṯp); 1b. to carry, to bear; additional constructs for carrier, bearer, supporter, (and types thereof); for fꜣ dnj, the "bearer-of-the-basket", see: Greek Kanephoros; 2. for kꜣt, kꜣwtj
𓀌	A10; U+1300C	seated man holding oar	to saw (sqdw); rower, oarsman (ẖn)		
𓀍	A11; U+1300D	seated man holding scepter of authority and shepherd's crook	friend (ḫnms)		
𓀎	A12; U+1300E	soldier with bow and quiver	soldier, company/unit of soldiers (mnfyt), army/expedition (mšꜥ)		
𓀏	A13; U+1300F	man with arms tied behind his back	enemy (ḫfty); rebel (sbj)		Possibly also 'criminal', 'traitor', 'prisoner'
𓀐	A14; U+13010	falling man with blood streaming from his head	die (mwt); enemy (ḫfty)		The wound is either self-inflicted or from a weapon strike. The A14 figure could be a youth or child, being depicted without clothing, while A14A would be an adult.
𓀑	A14A; U+13011	man whose head is hit with an axe			
𓀒	A15; U+13012	man falling	trap (ḫr)		
𓀓	A16; U+13013	man bowing down	to bend or bow oneself (ksj)		A. Determinative for ks, ksj, & ks, to bow, to do homage, to submit; B. same for ḫꜣb, (and thematic words of ḫꜣ-ꜣ-b, star & luminary, hippopotamus, lamp & light, etc.)
𓀔	A17; U+13014	child sitting with hand to mouth	young, child (šrj); orphan (nmḥ); child (ẖrd, ḫy); infant (nnj)	ms, nn	A17, depicted with bare head, indicates the figure as a 'lower' class than A17A
𓀕	A17A; U+13015	child sitting with arms hanging down	Noble/Aristocratic Supplement for A3 and A17 sitting, sitting youth		The head of A17A indicates the class of the figure to be of a 'higher' class than A17
𓀖	A18; U+13016	child wearing red crown	foster child (jmty)		
𓀗	A19; U+13017	bent man leaning on staff	old, to be fragile (jꜣw); elder (smsw); great (wr); to lean (rhn); to hit (ḥwj)	jk	Perhaps also wise and sage
𓀘	A20; U+13018	man leaning on forked staff	elder (smsw)		
𓀙	A21; U+13019	man holding staff with handkerchief	Civil Servant (sr); Courtier (smr); great (wr); strike (ḥwj)		
𓀚	A22; U+1301A	statue of man with staff and scepter of authority	statue (ḥnṯ), (twt)		
𓀛	A23; U+1301B	king with staff and mace with round head	monarch, lord, ruler(jty)		
𓀜	A24; U+1301C	man striking with both hands	to hit or strike (ḥwj); power, strength (nḫt); teach lesson or instruct (sbꜣ); call (njs); be happy (ḥꜥj)		
𓀝	A25; U+1301D	man striking, with left arm hanging behind back	to hit or strike (ḥwj)		Most likely synonymous with A24
𓀞	A26; U+1301E	man with one arm pointing forward	call (njs, Ꜥš)		
𓀟	A27; U+1301F	hastening man	bring (jnj)	jn	
𓀠	A28; U+13020	man with hands raised on either side	to be high, in high spirits, elevate (qꜣj); mourn (ḥꜣj)		
𓀡	A29; U+13021	man upside down	headlong or head over heels (sḫd)		
𓀢	A30; U+13022	man with hands raised in front	praise, adore, laud, thank (dwꜣ)		
𓀣	A31; U+13023	man with hands raised behind him	to turn away (Ꜥn)		
𓀤	A32; U+13024	man dancing with arms to the back	dance (ḫbj); cheer, rejoice (hy-hnw); dance, dancer (jb)		
𓀥	A32A; U+13025	man dancing with arms to the front	(see above)		
𓀦	A33; U+13026	man with stick and bundle on shoulder	to herd, shepherd (mnjw); journey, tramp (ḫwsj); construction, (qd); foreign, strange(šmꜣw)		
𓀧	A34; U+13027	man pounding in a mortar	to stomp (ḫwsj)		Man grinding (etc.); to grind in a mortar, to build, to construct, etc.
𓀨	A35; U+13028	man building wall	to build (qd)		Man constructing: a "Mason"; Ideogram or det. for qd, Coptic “ⲔⲰⲦ“ "to construct"; (see Wall, (Collapsing)-Wall)
𓀩	A36; U+13029	man kneading into vessel	brewer (ꜥftj); grind (nḏ)		
𓀪	A37; U+1302A	man in vessel	brewer (ꜥftj)		
𓀫	A38; U+1302B	man holding necks of two emblematic animals with panther heads	Cusae (qjs)		
𓀬	A39; U+1302C	man on two giraffes	Cusae (qjs)		
𓀭	A40; U+1302D	seated god	I, me, my (when the speaker is a god) (.j); God(nṯr)		Determinative for God’s names
𓀮	A40A; U+1302E	seated god with Was-sceptre	I, me, my (when the speaker is a god) (.j); God(nṯr)		
𓀯	A41; U+1302F	king with uraeus	king (nsw); majesty (ḥm); I, me, my (when speaker is a king) (.j)		
𓀰	A42; U+13030	king with uraeus and flagellum	king (nsw); majesty (ḥm); I, me, my (when speaker is a king) (.j)		
𓀱	A42A; U+13031	king with uraeus and flagellum	king (nsw); majesty (ḥm); I, me, my (when speaker is a king) (.j)		
𓀲	A43; U+13032	king wearing white crown	King of Upper Egypt (nsw); Osiris (wsjr)		
𓀳	A43A; U+13033	king wearing white crown with sceptre	King of Upper Egypt (nsw); Osiris (wsjr)		
𓀴	A44; U+13034	king wearing white crown with flagellum	King of Upper Egypt (nsw); Atum (jtmw)		
𓀵	A45; U+13035	king wearing red crown	King of Lower Egypt (bjtj); King (nsw)	n	
𓀶	A45A; U+13036	king wearing red crown with sceptre	Atum (jtmw)	n	
𓀷	A46; U+13037	king wearing red crown with flagellum	King of Lower Egypt (bjtj)		
𓀸	A47; U+13038	shepherd seated and wrapped in mantle, holding stick	shepherd (mnjw); guard (sꜣw)		
𓀹	A48; U+13039	beardless man seated and holding knife	belonging to, keeper (jrj); Guardian, keeper (jrj)		
𓀺	A49; U+1303A	seated Syrian holding stick	foreigner, Asian (ꜥꜣmw)		
𓀻	A50; U+1303B	noble on chair	courtier (smr); I, me, my (when speaker is a nobleman) (.j); noble (šps)		
𓀼	A51; U+1303C	noble on chair with flagellum	to be of noble blood (špsj); undertake a task (špsj)		
𓀽	A52; U+1303D	noble squatting with flagellum	to be of noble blood (špsj)		
𓀾	A53; U+1303E	standing mummy	Image (twt)		Form, likeness, image, (double); Tutankhamun: Form-Living-(of)-Amun
𓀿	A54; U+1303F	lying mummy	death (mnj)		
𓁀	A55; U+13040	mummy on bed	lie down, spend the night(sḏr); corpse (ẖꜣt)		Overnight meaning an overnight stay in any location, i.e. 'spend the night at home', 'spent the night in a hotel', 'slept over at (random person's name)'s house', etc.
𓁁	A56; U+13041	seated man holding stick			
𓁂	A57; U+13042	man holding loaf on mat	An offering which the King gives (ḥtp-dj-nsw)		Abbreviation for the beginning of the Offering Formula.
𓁃	A58; U+13043	man applying hoe to ground			
𓁄	A59; U+13044	man threatening with stick			
𓁅	A60; U+13045	man sowing seeds	Spill, pour (stj)		
𓁆	A61; U+13046	man looking over his shoulder			
𓁇	A62; U+13047	Asiatic			
𓁈	A63; U+13048	king on throne holding staff			
𓁉	A64; U+13049	man sitting on heels holding forward cup			
𓁊	A65; U+1304A	man wearing tunic with fringes and holding mace			
𓁋	A66; U+1304B	man holding sistrum	Ihy (jḥy); Great God (Ptolemaic) (nṯr-Ꜥꜣ)		
𓁌	A67; U+1304C	dwarf			
𓁍	A68; U+1304D	man holding up knife	Black eye paint (msdmt)		
𓁎	A69; U+1304E	seated man with raised right arm and left arm hanging down			
𓁏	A70; U+1304F	seated man with raised arms	Heh (ḥḥ)		
	B		Woman and her occupations		
𓁐	B1; U+13050	seated woman	woman (zt); I, me, my (when speaker is feminine) (.j)		Determinative for feminine names
𓁑	B2; U+13051	pregnant woman	to be pregnant (bkꜣ); conceive (jwr)		
𓁒	B3; U+13052	woman giving birth	to give birth (msj); conceive (jwr)		
𓁓	B4; U+13053	combination of woman giving birth and three skins tied together	to give birth (msj)		
𓁔	B5; U+13054	woman suckling child	to nurse, to nurture, to care for (rnn); wet nurse (noun def. 1) (mnꜥt)		
𓁕	B5A; U+13055	woman suckling child (simplified)			
𓁖	B6; U+13056	woman on chair with child on lap	to nurse, to nurture, to care for (rnn)		
𓁗	B7; U+13057	queen wearing diadem and holding flower			
𓁘	B8; U+13058	woman holding lotus flower			
𓁙	B9; U+13059	woman holding sistrum			
	C		Anthropomorphic deities		
𓁚	C1; U+1305A	god with sun-disk and uraeus	Ra (rꜤ)		
𓁛	C2; U+1305B	god with falcon head and sun-disk holding ankh	Ideogram and Determinative for Ra (rꜤ)		Variant of C1 god with sun-disk and uraeus
𓁜	C2A; U+1305C	god with falcon head and sun-disk	Id. & Det. for Ra (rꜤ)		
𓁝	C2B; U+1305D	C2A reversed	Ra (rꜤ)		
𓁞	C2C; U+1305E	C2 reversed	Ra (rꜤ)		
𓁟	C3; U+1305F	god with ibis head	Id. & Det. for Thoth (ḏḥwty)		
𓁠	C4; U+13060	god with ram head	Id. & Det. for Khnum (ẖnmw)		
𓁡	C5; U+13061	god with ram head holding ankh	Id. & Det. for Khnum (ẖnmw)		Variant of C4 god with ram head
𓁢	C6; U+13062	god with jackal head	Id. & Det. for Anubis (jnpw); Id. & Det. for Wepwawet (wp-wꜣwt)		
𓁣	C7; U+13063	god with Seth-animal head	Id. & Det. for Seth (stḫ, stẖ, stš)		
𓁤	C8; U+13064	ithyphallic god with two plumes, uplifted arm and flagellum	Id. & Det. for Min (mnw)		
𓁥	C9; U+13065	goddess with horned sun-disk	Id. & Det. for Hathor (ḥwt-ḥr)		
𓁦	C10; U+13066	goddess with feather	Id. & Det. for Maat (mꜣꜥt)		
𓁧	C10A; U+13067	goddess with feather holding ankh	Id. & Det. for Maat (mꜣꜥt)		
𓁨	C11; U+13068	god with arms supporting the sky and palm branch on head	Id. & Det. for Heh (ḥḥ); Million (ḥḥ)		Million, many Heh (god)
𓁩	C12; U+13069	god with two plumes and scepter	Id. & Det. for Amun (jmn)		
𓁪	C13; U+1306A	C12 reversed	Amun (jmn)		
𓁫	C14; U+1306B	god with two plumes and scimitar	Amun is with his Strong Arm (Amunherkhepeshef) (jmn-ḥr-ḫpš.f)		Abbreviated form found In royal cartouches.
𓁬	C15; U+1306C	C14 reversed	Amun is with his Strong Arm (Amunherkhepeshef) (jmn-ḥr-ḫpš.f)		Abbreviated form found In royal cartouches.
𓁭	C16; U+1306D	god wearing red crown with ankh	Id. & Det. for Atum (jtmw)		
𓁮	C17; U+1306E	god with falcon head and two plumes	Id. & Det. for Montu (mnṯw)		
𓁯	C18; U+1306F	squatting god	Id. & Det. for Tatenen (tꜣ-ṯnn)		
𓁰	C19; U+13070	mummy-shaped god	Id. & Det. for Ptah (ptḥ); Divine (nṯry)		
𓁱	C20; U+13071	mummy-shaped god in shrine	Id. & Det. for Ptah (ptḥ); Divine (nṯry)		Variant of C19 mummy-shaped god
𓁲	C21; U+13072	Bes	Bes (bs)		
𓁳	C22; U+13073	god with falcon head and moon	Id. & Det. for Khonsu (ḫnsw)		
𓁴	C23; U+13074	goddess with feline head and sun with uraeus	Id. & Det. for Sekhmet (sḫmt), Menhit (mnḥyt), Mehit (mḥyt), Bastet (bꜣstt)		
𓁵	C24; U+13075	god wearing red crown with scepter	Id. & Det. for Atum (jtmw)		
	D		Parts of the human body		
𓁶	D1; U+13076	head	head (tp) (ḏꜣḏꜣ); back of head (ḥꜣ); behind (ḥꜣ); neglect, to leave behind (mkḥꜣ)		1. Ideogram for tp, "head"; other uses related to actions of the head; (example "the tp of the rebels", 'the "chief" of the rebels'); 2. also for tp, see archaic dagger 3. (Narmer Palette shows 10 enemy heads-(decapitated)); Possibly ancestral to Proto-Sinaitic Resh and its descendants
𓁷	D2; U+13077	face	face (ḥr); on, around, over, for (ḥr)	ḥr	1. Bil. hr-(ḥr); 2. Ideogram for 'face' 3. A major preposition for "on, upon", etc.; additional preposition constructs.
𓁸	D3; U+13078	hair	hair (šnj); skin (jnm); color (jwn); empty, barely, loss of hair (wš)		
𓁹	D4; U+13079	eye	eye (jrt); make, create, do (jrj); see (mꜣꜣ); watch, to be watchful, to be awake (rs); to be blind (šp)	jr	Part of the name Osiris Possibly ancestral to Proto-Sinaitic Ayin and its descendants
𓁺	D5; U+1307A	eye touched up with paint	eye (jrt); view (dgi); to be blind (šp)		
𓁻	D6; U+1307B	eye with painted upper lid	eye (jrt); view (dgi); to be blind (šp)		
𓁼	D7; U+1307C	eye with painted lower lid	eye make-up / eye paint (msdmt); decorate, adorn, to be beautiful (ꜥn); view (ptr); see (mꜣꜣ) (seldom, rarely used)		
𓁽	D8; U+1307D	eye enclosed in sandy tract	decorate, adorn, to be beautiful (ꜥn)		
𓁾	D8A; U+1307E	eye with painted lower lid enclosed in sandy tract	decorate, adorn, to be beautiful (ꜥn)		
𓁿	D9; U+1307F	eye with flowing tears	weep (rmj); person (rmṯ) (Ptolemaic rebus)		
𓂀	D10; U+13080	Eye of Horus	Udjat-eye (wḏꜣt); Eye (jrt); Bright (bꜣq, in bꜣqt Egypt)		Eye of Horus
𓂁	D11; U+13081	left part of Eye of Horus	abbreviation for Heqat-measure grain: 1/2		
𓂂	D12; U+13082	pupil	Eye (jr) (Pars-pro-toto substitution); abbreviation for Heqat-measure grain: 1/4		Determinative for pupil (ḏfḏ)
𓂃	D13; U+13083	eyebrow	abbreviation for Heqat-measure grain: 1/8	smd	
𓂄	D14; U+13084	right part of Eye of Horus	abbreviation for Heqat-measure grain: 1/16		
𓂅	D15; U+13085	diagonal marking of Eye of Horus	abbreviation for Heqat-measure grain: 1/32		
𓂆	D16; U+13086	vertical marking of Eye of Horus	abbreviation for Heqat-measure grain: 1/64		
𓂇	D17; U+13087	diagonal and vertical markings of Eye of Horus	Image (twt)		
𓂈	D18; U+13088	ear	to listen (sḏm); Ear (msḏr)		
𓂉	D19; U+13089	nose, eye and cheek	nose (fnḏ), smell (sn), be happy (ršw), face, front (ḫnt),	ḫnt	Ideogram or det. for the "nose", fnḏ/fnd, det. for words relating to smell, joy, and the nose
𓂊	D20; U+1308A	nose, eye and cheek (cursive)	nose (fnḏ), smell (sn), be happy (ršw), face, front (ḫnt),		Ideogram or det. for the "nose", fnḏ/fnd, det. for words relating to smell, joy, and the nose
𓂋	D21; U+1308B	mouth; compare V38	mouth, utterance (r[ꜣ]); Turn about (pẖr)	r, jw (Ptolemaic)	Uniliteral r. Possibly ancestral to Proto-Sinaitic Pe and its descendants
𓂌	D22; U+1308C	mouth with two strokes	2/3 (rꜣwj)		
𓂍	D23; U+1308D	mouth with three strokes	3/4 (ḫmt-rꜣw)		
𓂎	D24; U+1308E	upper lip with teeth	Lip (spt)		
𓂏	D25; U+1308F	lips	(both) lips (sptj)		
𓂐	D26; U+13090	liquid issuing from lips	spit (psg); to spit, to vomit (bšj); blood (snf)	p (Ptolemaic)	
𓂑	D27; U+13091	small breast	to suckle (snq); breast (mnḏ); wet nurse (mnꜥt)		
𓂒	D27A; U+13092	large breast	to suckle (snq); breast (mnḏ); wet nurse (mnꜥt)		
𓂓	D28; U+13093	two arms upraised	the Ka (life spirit) (kꜣ)	kꜣ	
𓂔	D29; U+13094	combination of two arms upraised (D28) and standard (R12)	the Ka (life spirit) (kꜣ)		
𓂕	D30; U+13095	two arms upraised with tail	The god Nehebkau (nḥb-kꜣw)		
𓂖	D31; U+13096	arms embracing club	mortuary priest (ḥm-kꜣ)		
𓂗	D31A; U+13097	combination of two arms upraised (D28) and club	mortuary priest (ḥm-kꜣ)		
𓂘	D32; U+13098	arms embracing	enclose (jnq); embrace (ḥpt, sḫn); open the arms (pgꜣ)		
𓂙	D33; U+13099	arms rowing	to row (ẖnj)	ẖn	
𓂚	D34; U+1309A	arms with shield and battle axe	Fight, combat (ꜥḥꜣ)		
𓂛	D34A; U+1309B	arms with shield and mace	Fight, combat (ꜥḥꜣ)		
𓂜	D35; U+1309C	arms in gesture of negation	not (n, nn); that which is not (jwtj); to not know (ḫm); shrine (ḫm); forget (smḫ)	n, nj	
𓂝	D36; U+1309D	forearm (palm upwards)	arm (ꜥ); cubit (mḥ)	ꜥ	Uniliteral sign representing Egyptian ayin Possibly ancestral to Proto-Sinaitic Yodh and its descendants
𓂞	D37; U+1309E	forearm with bread cone	give (jmj); give (rḏj, ḏj)	ḏ (only in ḏdw busiris), d, mj, m	
𓂟	D38; U+1309F	forearm with rounded loaf	to give (jmj); to give (rḏj, ḏj); to present (ḥnk)	mj, m, mwt (mother)	
𓂠	D39; U+130A0	forearm with bowl	to present (ḥnk)	m, mwt (Mother)	
𓂡	D40; U+130A1	forearm with stick	strength (nḫt); to strike (ḥwj); to examine (ḫꜣj)		Determinative for words involving strength, physical force, the use of the arm
𓂢	D41; U+130A2	forearm with palm down and bent upper arm	arm (gbꜣ); shoulder (rmn); left (jꜣbj); sing (ḥsj); bend (ḥms); end (grḥ); negation (nj)	nj	
𓂣	D42; U+130A3	forearm with palm down and straight upper arm	Cubit (mḥ)		
𓂤	D43; U+130A4	forearm with flail	protect (ḫwj)		
𓂥	D44; U+130A5	arm with sekhem scepter	control (ḫrp)		
𓂦	D45; U+130A6	arm with wand	sacred, holy, be holy (ḏsr)		to be holy, to segregate See ḏsr
𓂧	D46; U+130A7	hand	hand (ḏrt)	d, rarely t	Uniliteral d. Possibly ancestral to Proto-Sinaitic Kaph and its descendants
𓂨	D46A; U+130A8	liquid falling from hand	to cense, to pour out a libation (jdj); dew (jdt, jꜣdt)		
𓂩	D47; U+130A9	hand with palm up	hand (ḏrt); receive (sšp, šsp)		
𓂪	D48; U+130AA	hand without thumb	hand width (šsp)		
𓂫	D48A; U+130AB	hand holding egg			
𓂬	D49; U+130AC	fist	grasp (ꜣmm, ḫfꜥ)		
𓂭	D50; U+130AD	one finger	finger (ḏbꜥ); abbreviation for 10,000 (ḏbꜥ)		
𓂮	D50A; U+130AE	two fingers	20,000		
𓂯	D50B; U+130AF	three fingers	30,000		
𓂰	D50C; U+130B0	four fingers	40,000		
𓂱	D50D; U+130B1	five fingers	50,000		
𓂲	D50E; U+130B2	six fingers	60,000		
𓂳	D50F; U+130B3	seven fingers	70,000		
𓂴	D50G; U+130B4	eight fingers	80,000		
𓂵	D50H; U+130B5	nine fingers	90,000		
𓂶	D50I; U+130B6	five fingers (row)	50,000		
𓂷	D51; U+130B7	one finger (horizontal)	finger nail (ꜥnt); Activities with finger: measure (ḫꜣj), take (ṯꜣj), press (dqr)		
𓂸	D52; U+130B8	phallus	phallus (ḥnn); man-like, man (ṯꜣy); donkey (ꜥꜣ); bull (kꜣ); presence (bꜣḥ)	mt	D52; Excluded from default fonts by some OS vendors. Determinative in words relating to men, masculinity, fluids.
𓂹	D52A; U+130B9	phallus with folded cloth	Bear witness (smtr)		Excluded from default fonts by some OS vendors.
𓂺	D53; U+130BA	phallus with emission	phallus (ḥnn); man-like, man (ṯꜣy); bull (kꜣ); presence (bꜣḥ); urinate (wsš)		D53; Excluded from default fonts by some OS vendors.
𓂻	D54; U+130BB	legs walking	stride (nmtt); come (jw)	jw	Determinative for words involving motion
𓂼	D54A; U+130BC	hieratic legs walking			
𓂽	D55; U+130BD	legs walking backwards	come (jw)		
𓂾	D56; U+130BE	leg	leg (rd); Gazelle (gḥs); foot, part (wꜥrt)	pd	Ideo., det. for leg, to tread
𓂿	D57; U+130BF	leg with knife	mutilate (jꜣtj); injure (nkn)		
𓃀	D58; U+130C0	foot	place (bw)	b	uniliteral b
𓃁	D59; U+130C1	foot and forearm		ꜥb, bꜥ	
𓃂	D60; U+130C2	foot under vase from which water flows	be pure, clean (wꜥb)		
𓃃	D61; U+130C3	three toes oriented leftward	toe (sꜣḥ)		
𓃄	D62; U+130C4	three toes oriented rightward	toe (sꜣḥ)		
𓃅	D63; U+130C5	two toes oriented leftward	toe (sꜣḥ); The god Sah (sꜣḥ)		
𓃆	D64; U+130C6	hand with palm down			
𓃇	D65; U+130C7	Sidelock of hair	Sidelock (ḥnsqty)		
𓃈	D66; U+130C8	arm with reed pen	Inscribe (spẖr)		
𓃉	D67; U+130C9	one dot			
𓃊	D67A; U+130CA	two dots			
𓃋	D67B; U+130CB	three dots			
𓃌	D67C; U+130CC	four dots			
𓃍	D67D; U+130CD	five dots			
𓃎	D67E; U+130CE	six dots			
𓃏	D67F; U+130CF	seven dots			
𓃐	D67G; U+130D0	eight dots			
𓃑	D67H; U+130D1	nine dots			
	E		Mammals		
𓃒	E1; U+130D2	bull	Bull (kꜣ)		
𓃓	E2; U+130D3	bull charging	Bull (kꜣ)		
𓃔	E3; U+130D4	calf	Calf (bḥs)		
𓃕	E4; U+130D5	sacred cow	Hesat (ḥsꜣt)		
𓃖	E5; U+130D6	cow suckling calf	Be friendly (ꜣms)		
𓃗	E6; U+130D7	horse	Horse (ssmt, jbr)		
𓃘	E7; U+130D8	donkey	Donkey (ꜥꜣ)		
𓃙	E8; U+130D9	kid	Kid (goat) (jb)	jb	
𓃚	E8A; U+130DA	kid jumping	Kid (goat) (jb)	jb	
𓃛	E9; U+130DB	newborn hartebeest		jw	Determinative for newborn animals, etc.
𓃜	E9A; U+130DC	mature bovine lying down	Be friendly (ꜣms); Cow (jḥ); Lady (nbt) (Ptolemaic)		
𓃝	E10; U+130DD	ram	Ba-Soul (bꜣ); Khnum (ẖnmw)		
𓃞	E11; U+130DE	ram	Ba-Soul (bꜣ); Khnum (ẖnmw)		
𓃟	E12; U+130DF	pig	Pig (rrj)		
𓃠	E13; U+130E0	cat	Cat (mjw); When (ḫft-ḥr) (Ptolemaic)	mj	Determinative for cat, as well as for the onomatopoeic Egyptian miu (meow)
𓃡	E14; U+130E1	dog	Dog (ṯsm)		
𓃢	E15; U+130E2	lying canine	Anubis (jnpw); He Who is Privy to Secrets (A priestly title) (ḥrj-sštꜣ)		
𓃣	E16; U+130E3	lying canine on shrine	Anubis (jnpw); He Who is Privy to Secrets (A priestly title) (ḥrj-sštꜣ)		
𓃤	E16A; U+130E4	lying canine on shrine with flagellum	Anubis (jnpw)		
𓃥	E17; U+130E5	jackal	jackal, (sꜣb); dignitary, senior (sꜣb); come (jw); East (jꜣbtt)		
𓃦	E17A; U+130E6	jackal looking back			
𓃧	E18; U+130E7	wolf on standard	Wepwawet (wpj-wꜣwt)		
𓃨	E19; U+130E8	wolf on standard with mace	Wepwawet (wpj-wꜣwt)		
𓃩	E20; U+130E9	Set-animal	Set (stẖ, stš, swty)		
𓃪	E20A; U+130EA	Set-animal on basket			
𓃫	E21; U+130EB	lying Set-animal	Set (stẖ, stš, swty); storm (nšnj)		
𓃬	E22; U+130EC	lion	lion (mꜣj); exclude (šnꜥ)		
𓃭	E23; U+130ED	lying lion	lion (rw); lord (nb) (Ptolemaic)	rw, r, later l	
𓃮	E24; U+130EE	panther	leopard (ꜣby)		
𓃯	E25; U+130EF	hippopotamus	Hippo (db)	db	
𓃰	E26; U+130F0	elephant	elephant (ꜣbw, ꜣb, dnhr)		1. Determinative in ꜣbw, elephant (ultimate source of English word ivory)
𓃱	E27; U+130F1	giraffe	giraffe (mmj, sr); fortell (sr)		
𓃲	E28; U+130F2	oryx	gazelle (gḥs, mꜣ-ḥḏ)		
𓃳	E28A; U+130F3	oryx with irrigation system	Oryx, Ma-hedj (mꜣ-ḥḏ)		16th Nome of Upper Egypt (see NU16), Ma-hedj
𓃴	E29; U+130F4	gazelle	gazelle (gḥs)		
𓃵	E30; U+130F5	ibex	Ibex (njꜣw)		
𓃶	E31; U+130F6	goat with collar	Noble, rank, be noble (sꜥḥ)		
𓃷	E32; U+130F7	baboon	baboon (jꜥn, ky, qnd)		
𓃸	E33; U+130F8	monkey	monkey (gjf, qnd)		
𓃹	E34; U+130F9	hare	Hare (wn)	wn	Biliteral wn in wn ‘open’, wn ‘to be, exist’
𓃺	E34A; U+130FA	hare (low)	See E34		
𓃻	E36; U+130FB	baboon	Thoth (ḏḥwty); King (nswt) (Ptolemaic); beautiful, good (nfr) (Ptolemaic); scribe (sẖꜣ) (Ptolemaic); son (sꜣ) (Ptolemaic); speak (ḏd) (Ptolemaic)		Used most commonly for various cryptographic values in Ptolemaic texts.
𓃼	E37; U+130FC	baboon with receptacle and basket	water-clock (Clepsydra) (šbt)		
𓃽	E38; U+130FD	long-horned bull	Bull (kꜣ)		
	F		Parts of mammals		
𓃾	F1; U+130FE	ox head		kꜣ	Possibly ancestral to Proto-Sinaitic Aleph and its descendants
𓃿	F1A; U+130FF	bovine head	nose (fnḏ); Front, foremost (ḫnt)		Interchangeable with D19
𓄀	F2; U+13100	charging ox head	Bull (kꜣ)		
𓄁	F3; U+13101	hippopotamus head	Moment (ꜣt); head (dp)		
𓄂	F4; U+13102	forepart of lion	Front, foremost, prow (ḥꜣt)		
𓄃	F5; U+13103	hartebeest head	wise, skilled (šsꜣ)		
𓄄	F6; U+13104	forepart of hartebeest	wise, skilled (šsꜣ)		
𓄅	F7; U+13105	ram head	Terror, awe (šfyt)		
𓄆	F8; U+13106	forepart of ram	Terror, awe (šfyt)		
𓄇	F9; U+13107	leopard head	Strength (pḥty); Moment (ꜣt)		Determinative or abbreviation for pḥty, "strength"
𓄈	F10; U+13108	head and neck of animal	Throat (ḫḫ); know (ꜥm); swallow (ꜥm)		
𓄉	F11; U+13109	head and neck of animal	Throat (ḫḫ); know (ꜥm); swallow (ꜥm)		
𓄊	F12; U+1310A	head and neck of animal	Power (wsr)	wsr	
𓄋	F13; U+1310B	horns	open (wpj)	wp, jp	in the New Year festival, wp-rnpt ‘opening the year’
𓄌	F13A; U+1310C	horns		wp	
𓄍	F14; U+1310D	horns with palm branch	opening the year (New year festival) (wp[t]-rnpt)		
𓄎	F15; U+1310E	horns with palm branch and sun	opening the year (New year festival) (wp[t]-rnpt)		
𓄏	F16; U+1310F	horn	horn (ꜥb)	ꜥb	
𓄐	F17; U+13110	horn and vase from which water flows	purity (ꜥbw)		
𓄑	F18; U+13111	tusk		bḥ, ḥw, ḥ	
𓄒	F19; U+13112	lower jaw-bone of ox	jaw (ꜥrt)		
𓄓	F20; U+13113	tongue	tongue (ns)	ns	1. Egyp. bil. ns.; 2. A-tongue, and related words for speech; B-30th-(the 'Last Day of the Month'), and therefore, (next)-last
𓄔	F21; U+13114	ear of bovine	Ear (msḏr); leaf (ḏrḏ); hear, listen (sḏm)	jdn	
𓄕	F21A; U+13115	hieratic ear of bovine	Ear (msḏr); hear, listen (sḏm)		
𓄖	F22; U+13116	hind-quarters of lion	hindquarters, back part (pḥt); strength (pḥty)	pḥ	Biliteral pḥ
𓄗	F23; U+13117	foreleg of ox	Foreleg (ḫpš); power (ḫpš)		
𓄘	F24; U+13118	F23 reversed	power (ḫpš)	ḫpš	
𓄙	F25; U+13119	leg of ox	Cow’s leg (wḥm); Repeat (wḥm)	wḥm	
𓄚	F26; U+1311A	skin of goat	Interior (ẖn)	ẖn	
𓄛	F27; U+1311B	skin of cow with bent tail	Leather, hide (dḥr)		Determinative for animals
𓄜	F28; U+1311C	skin of cow with straight tail	Spotted, dappled (sꜣb)	k (Ptolemaic)	
𓄝	F29; U+1311D	cow's skin pierced by arrow	Shoot, ejaculate, shine (sṯj)		
𓄞	F30; U+1311E	water- skin	Save (šdj); Read aloud (šdj)	šd	1. Determinative for šdw, "belly"; phon. for šd 2. (See: similar shaped hieroglyph: V22 whip)
𓄟	F31; U+1311F	three skins tied together	Create, give birth (msj)	ms	Bil. ms, "born", "born-of"; example, Pharaoh Ahmose, "Moon-Born"; Kamose, "Spirit-Born"
𓄠	F31A; U+13120	three skins tied together	Create, give birth (msj)	ms	
𓄡	F32; U+13121	animal's belly	body (ẖt)	ẖ	Uniliteral ẖ
𓄢	F33; U+13122	tail	Tail (sd)	sd	1. Determinative for sd, "tail"; then phon., sd 2. (See: the Sed festival, 'Festival of the Tail')
𓄣	F34; U+13123	heart	Heart (jb); heart (ḥ3ty)	jb	Ideogram or det. for ib, "heart" or also ḥ3ty,"heart"
𓄤	F35; U+13124	heart and windpipe	Good, beautiful, perfect, young (nfr)	nf (Ptolemaic)	Egyptian triliteral sign for nfr, (beauty), or "perfect" Possibly ancestral to Proto-Sinaitic Teth and its descendants
𓄥	F36; U+13125	lung and windpipe	Unite, join (smꜣ) (smꜣ)	smꜣ	Egyptian "lung", used for union, (as in the "Two Lands", "Upper and Lower Egypt)
𓄦	F37; U+13126	backbone and ribs and spinal cord	Slaughtering, massacre (šꜥt); Back (jꜣt)		
𓄧	F37A; U+13127	backbone and ribs	Slaughtering, massacre (šꜥt); Back (jꜣt)		
𓄨	F38; U+13128	backbone and ribs	Back (jꜣt)	psḏ	
𓄩	F38A; U+13129	backbone and ribs and spinal cord			
𓄪	F39; U+1312A	backbone and spinal cord	Spinal cord (jmꜣḫ); Veneration, reveredness (jmꜣḫ)	jmꜣḫ, psḏ	
𓄫	F40; U+1312B	backbone and spinal cords	Be long, extend (ꜣw)	ꜣw	To be long, length, to extend Pharaoh: Extent of Happiness-(for Egypt-Land), F40 F34, (on reliefs) (i.e. the Welfare of the Nation)
𓄬	F41; U+1312C	vertebrae	Slaughtering, massacre (šꜥt)	psḏ	
𓄭	F42; U+1312D	rib	rib (spr)	spr	
𓄮	F43; U+1312E	ribs	Beef ribs (spḥt)		
𓄯	F44; U+1312F	bone with meat	reward (jsw); Heir, inheritor, inheritance (jwꜥ); Thigh bone (swt)		
𓄰	F45; U+13130	uterus	vulva, womb, cow (jdt)		
𓄱	F45A; U+13131	uterus		m (Ptolemaic)	
𓄲	F46; U+13132	intestine	Turn about (pẖr); Fold, turn back (wḏb)	dbn	
𓄳	F46A; U+13133	intestine	Turn about (pẖr); Fold, turn back (wḏb)	dbn	
𓄴	F47; U+13134	intestine	Turn about (pẖr); Fold, turn back (wḏb)	dbn	
𓄵	F47A; U+13135	intestine	Turn about (pẖr); Fold, turn back (wḏb)	dbn	
𓄶	F48; U+13136	intestine	Turn about (pẖr); Fold, turn back (wḏb)	dbn	
𓄷	F49; U+13137	intestine	Turn about (pẖr); Fold, turn back (wḏb)	dbn	
𓄸	F50; U+13138	combination of F46 and S29	Inscribe (spẖr)		
𓄹	F51; U+13139	piece of flesh	Flesh (jwf)	ꜣs, ws, f (Ptolemaic)	
𓄺	F51A; U+1313A	three pieces of flesh horizontally	Flesh (jwf)		
𓄻	F51B; U+1313B	three pieces of flesh vertically	Flesh (jwf)		
𓄼	F51C; U+1313C	F51 reversed			
𓄽	F52; U+1313D	excrement	Excrement (ḥs)		
𓄾	F53; U+1313E	divine rod with ram head		mt	
	G		Birds		
𓄿	G1; U+1313F	Egyptian vulture		ꜣ	Uniliteral sign representing Egyptian alef
𓅀	G2; U+13140	two Egyptian vultures		ꜣꜣ	
𓅁	G3; U+13141	combination of Egyptian vulture and sickle		mꜣ	
𓅂	G4; U+13142	buzzard	tjw	tjw	Tril. tjw, often used as a plural Nisbe ending -tjw
𓅃	G5; U+13143	falcon	Horus (ḥrw); God (nṯr) (Ptolemaic); Above (ḥry) (Ptolemaic); lord (nb) (Ptolemaic)		Horus; about 200 forms of Horus; for example: Horus-the-Child, Greek language-equivalent, Harpokrates; Egyptian, ḥrw-pꜣ-ẖrd, G5 Q3 F32 D21 D46 A17
𓅄	G6; U+13144	combination of falcon and flaggellum	falcon (bjk); Horus (ḥrw); God (nṯr) (Ptolemaic); lord (nb) (Ptolemaic)		
𓅅	G6A; U+13145	falcon on basket			
𓅆	G7; U+13146	falcon on standard	God (nṯr); King (nswt) (Rarely)		Determinative for god names
𓅇	G7A; U+13147	falcon in boat	Nemty (nmty)		
𓅈	G7B; U+13148	falcon in boat	Nemty (nmty)		
𓅉	G8; U+13149	falcon on collar of beads	Horus/Falcon of Gold (ḥr-nbw/bjk-nbw)		
𓅊	G9; U+1314A	falcon with sun on head	Ra-Horus (rꜥ-ḥrw)		Most often in the name of Ra-Horakhty (rꜥ-ḥrw-ꜣḫtj)
𓅋	G10; U+1314B	falcon in Sokar barque	Sokar (skr); Henu-bark (ḥnw)		
𓅌	G11; U+1314C	image of falcon	Sopdu (spdw); Image (ꜥẖm, ꜥšm, ꜥḫm); Falcon (gnḥsw, šnbt)		
𓅍	G11A; U+1314D	image of falcon on standard			
𓅎	G12; U+1314E	combination of image of falcon and flagellum	Sopdu (spdw); Image (ꜥẖm, ꜥšm, ꜥḫm); Falcon (gnḥsw, šnbt)		
𓅏	G13; U+1314F	image of falcon with two plumes	Sopdu (spdw); Horus of Nekhen (Hierakonpolis) (ḥrw-nḫnj)		
𓅐	G14; U+13150	vulture	Mother (mwt); vulture (nrt)		
𓅑	G15; U+13151	combination of vulture and flagellum	Mother (mwt); vulture (nrt); Mut (mwt)		
𓅒	G16; U+13152	vulture and cobra each on a basket	Two Ladies (nbtj)		See Two Ladies
𓅓	G17; U+13153	owl		m, jm, n (Ptolemaic)	Uniliteral m.
𓅔	G18; U+13154	two owls		mm, m, nm	
𓅕	G19; U+13155	combination of owl and forearm with conical loaf		m, mj	
𓅖	G20; U+13156	combination of owl and forearm	In the hand (m-ꜥ)	m, mj, mꜥ, ꜥm, m-ꜥ	
𓅗	G20A; U+13157	combination of owl and mouth (D21)		mr	
𓅘	G21; U+13158	guineafowl		nḥ, nḥḥ	1. Egyp. bil. nḥ, for the bird; phon. for nḥ; 2. Ideas of petition, supplicate, beseech; for Egyptian language nḥ-t, nḥḥ-t, oil, unguent, equivalent of Coptic language, "ⲛⲉϩ"; 3. for nḥḥ, eternity, or ever and ever, (see also ḥḥ'), Coptic "ⲉⲛⲉϩ"
𓅙	G22; U+13159	hoopoe		ḏb	
𓅚	G23; U+1315A	lapwing	The common (Rekhyt-) people, subjects (rḫyt)		
𓅛	G24; U+1315B	lapwing with twisted wings	The common (Rekhyt-) people, subjects (rḫyt)		
𓅜	G25; U+1315C	northern bald ibis	Be effective, effective (Akh) spirit (ꜣḫ)	ꜣḫ	Bil. ꜣḫ
𓅝	G26; U+1315D	sacred Ibis on standard	Ibis (hb); Thoth (ḏḥwtj)		God Thoth, the god of scribes
𓅞	G26A; U+1315E	sacred Ibis	Ibis (hb); Thoth (ḏḥwtj); Excellent, skilled (jqr); Discern, reckon (jp)		
𓅟	G27; U+1315F	flamingo	flamingo (dšr); red (dšr)		
𓅠	G28; U+13160	glossy ibis	to find, discover (gmj)	gm	
𓅡	G29; U+13161	saddle-billed stork	Ba-soul (bꜣ)	bꜣ	
𓅢	G30; U+13162	three saddle-billed storks	Ba-souls; metaphorically: Power, glory, respect (bꜣw)		
𓅣	G31; U+13163	heron	Heron/Bennu-bird (bnw)		1. the heron-like Bennu; 2. Determinative for bnw, the "Phoenix-bird"
𓅤	G32; U+13164	heron on perch	to inundate (bꜥḥj)		
𓅥	G33; U+13165	cattle egret	to tremble (sdꜣ/sdꜣdꜣ)		
𓅦	G34; U+13166	ostrich	ostrich (njw)		
𓅧	G35; U+13167	cormorant	to enter (ꜥq)	ꜥq	
𓅨	G36; U+13168	swallow	swallow (mnt); great, elder (wr)	wr	bil. wr
𓅩	G36A; U+13169	swallow (low)	swallow (mnt); great, elder (wr)	wr	
𓅪	G37; U+1316A	sparrow	Bad (bjn); Small, weak (nḏs)		Determinative for various words related to negativity, small, bad
𓅫	G37A; U+1316B	sparrow (low)	Bad (bjn); Small, weak (nḏs)		
𓅬	G38; U+1316C	goose	Bird (ꜣpd); Geb (gb); Destroy (ḥtm)		The main example cited in Gardiner’s original is shown in the tomb BH3
𓅭	G39; U+1316D	pintail duck	Son (sꜣ/zꜣ)		
𓅮	G40; U+1316E	pintail flying	Fly (pꜣ)	pꜣ	Ideogram and bil. for pꜣ
𓅯	G41; U+1316F	pintail alighting	Alight (ḫnj)	pꜣ, qmꜣ	
𓅰	G42; U+13170	widgeon	to fatten (wšꜣ); Food (ḏfꜣw)		
𓅱	G43; U+13171	quail chick	Field, district, region (w)	w	1. Unil. w 2. Either "quail chick" or equivalent coil (hieroglyph), Gardiner Z7, Z7, used also for the plural word ending
𓅲	G43A; U+13172	combination of quail chick and flat loaf		tw	
𓅳	G44; U+13173	two quail chicks		ww	
𓅴	G45; U+13174	combination of quail chick and forearm		wꜥ, ꜥw	
𓅵	G45A; U+13175	combination of quail chick and forearm with conical loaf			
𓅶	G46; U+13176	combination of quail chick and sickle		mꜣw	
𓅷	G47; U+13177	duckling	Fledgeling (ṯꜣ); Vizier (ṯꜣty)	ṯꜣ	Bil. ṯꜣ
𓅸	G48; U+13178	three ducklings in nest	nest, pond, marsh (sš)		
𓅹	G49; U+13179	three ducklings in pool	nest, pond, marsh (sš)		
𓅺	G50; U+1317A	two plovers	Washerman (rḫtj)		
𓅻	G51; U+1317B	bird pecking at fish	to catch fish (ḥꜣm/ḥjm)		
𓅼	G52; U+1317C	goose picking up grain	to feed (snm)		
𓅽	G53; U+1317D	human-headed bird with bowl with smoke	Ba-soul (bꜣ)		Ba
𓅾	G54; U+1317E	plucked bird	to wring (birds' necks) (wšn); to fear (snḏ)		1. Determinative for wšn, Egyptian: "twist the neck (of a bird)" 2. Phonetically sn(tj), (snṯ); 3. (see Trussed-goose Palette)
	H		Parts of birds		
𓅿	H1; U+1317F	head of pintail	bird (ꜣpd); Wring (the neck of a bird (wšn)	mꜣꜥ, wšm, pq (pꜣq)	1. an abbreviation for ꜣpd, "bird"
𓆀	H2; U+13180	head of heron	Be effective (ꜣḫ)	mꜣꜥ, wšm, pq (pꜣq)	1. Phoneme for pq 2. Also as: or Q3 W11 S28
𓆁	H3; U+13181	head of spoonbill	Speak (ḏd) (Ptolemaic)	pꜣq, pq	
𓆂	H4; U+13182	head of vulture	Fear (nr); Person (rmṯ)		
𓆃	H5; U+13183	wing	wing (ḏnḥ); fly (pꜣ)		
𓆄	H6; U+13184	feather	feather, plumage (šwt); Maat (mꜣꜥt); Shu (šw); True (mꜣꜥ)		
𓆅	H6A; U+13185	hieratic feather	feather, plumage (šwt); Maat (mꜣꜥt); Shu (šw)		
𓆆	H7; U+13186	bird foot	Claw (ꜥnt)	šꜣ (only in country šꜣt)	
𓆇	H8; U+13187	egg	son (sꜣ/zꜣ)		det. for feminine in goddess names, wives, etc.; det. in swḥt, 'egg'
	I		Amphibious animals, reptiles, etc.		
𓆈	I1; U+13188	gecko	Multitudes, countless (ꜥšꜣ); Lizard (ꜥšꜣ)		
𓆉	I2; U+13189	turtle	Turtle (št)		
𓆊	I3; U+1318A	crocodile	Crocodile (msḥ, jt, ḥntj); Sobek (sbk)	jt, m	
𓆋	I4; U+1318B	crocodile on shrine	Sobek (sbk)		Ideogram of det. for sbk, (Sobek); (see also Crocodile)
𓆌	I5; U+1318C	crocodile with curved tail	pull together, be wary (sꜣq)		
𓆍	I5A; U+1318D	image of crocodile	Sobek (sbk); image (ꜥẖm, ꜥšm)		
𓆎	I6; U+1318E	crocodile scales	black, dark (km)	km	
𓆏	I7; U+1318F	frog	Heket (ḥqt); Frog (ꜥbḫn, qrr); Frog (lit. ‘repeating life’) (wḥm-ꜥnḫ); 100,000 (ḥfn) (see I8)		Determinative, frog; (See also (frog)-Goddess Heket, her 'emblem')
𓆐	I8; U+13190	tadpole	100,000 (ḥfn)		
𓆑	I9; U+13191	horned viper		f	Uniliteral f, 3rd person singular masculine suffix pronoun .f, also determinative for unknown reasons in jt ‘Father’.
𓆒	I9A; U+13192	horned viper crawling out of enclosure	Come forth (prj)		
𓆓	I10; U+13193	cobra in repose	Cobra (ḏt)	ḏ	Uniliteral ḏ
𓆔	I10A; U+13194	cobra with feather			
𓆕	I11; U+13195	two cobras		ḏḏ	
𓆖	I11A; U+13196	combination of cobra, flat loaf and sandy tract	(linear/stable) eternity (ḏt)		
𓆗	I12; U+13197	cobra erect as on the forehead of the Pharaoh	Uraeus (jꜥrt); Lady (nbt) (Ptolemaic)	k (Ptolemaic)	Uraeus; Determinative for jꜥrt "uraeus", determinative for all goddesses, but especially those to whom the appearance of a snake was attributed
𓆘	I13; U+13198	erect cobra on basket	Wadjet (wꜣḏt); Lady (nbt)		Uraeus; Determinative for goddesses, especially Wadjet
𓆙	I14; U+13199	snake	Snake (ḥfꜣw)	r (ptolemaic), f (Ptolemaic), ḏ (Ptolemaic)	
𓆚	I15; U+1319A	snake	Snake (ḥfꜣw)		
	K		Fishes and parts of fishes		
𓆛	K1; U+1319B	tilapia	Nile tilapia (jnt)	jn	Egyptian biliteral sign jn; det. for "Tilapia", jnt; the common fish shape for reliefs & art; also for the fish cosmetic palettes
𓆜	K2; U+1319C	barbel	Abomination (bwt)	bw, s (Late period)	
𓆝	K3; U+1319D	mullet	flathead mullet (ꜥḏw)	ꜥḏ	
𓆞	K4; U+1319E	elephant-snout fish	Mormyrus (ẖꜣt); Corpse (ẖꜣt)	ẖꜣ	1. Phonetic value ẖꜣ, from name, ideogram ẖjt 2. Bil. for ẖꜣ
𓆟	K5; U+1319F	Petrocephalus bane	Fish (rm)	bs	
𓆠	K6; U+131A0	fish scale	fish scale (nšmt)		
𓆡	K7; U+131A1	puffer	Nile pufferfish, angry, discontent (špt)		
𓆢	K8; U+131A2	catfish	Catfish (nꜥr)		
	L		Invertebrata and lesser animals		
𓆣	L1; U+131A3	dung beetle	dung beetle/scarab, become, emerge, manifest (ḫpr); land (tꜣ) (Late period)		See: Scarab (artifact); See: God Khepri
𓆤	L2; U+131A4	bee	bee (bjt)	bjt (only in "king of lower Egypt" (bjt))	In the royal title “Dual King” (nswt-bjty)- possibly a symbol for Lower Egypt together with the sedge for Upper Egypt (see L2A)
𓆥	L2A; U+131A5	combination of bee, sedge and two flat loafs	Dual King (nswt-bjty)		Title preceding the Throne name of a king. Translation contested.
𓆦	L3; U+131A6	fly	fly (ꜥff)		Depicted on necklaces awarded for military bravery
𓆧	L4; U+131A7	locust	Grasshopper (znḥm)	r (Cryptographic)	
𓆨	L5; U+131A8	centipede	centipede (spꜣ)		
𓆩	L6; U+131A9	shell		ḫꜣ (rarely)	
𓆪	L6A; U+131AA	L6 reversed			
𓆫	L7; U+131AB	scorpion	Serket (srqt)		Mutilated for superstitious reasons
𓆬	L8; U+131AC				
	M		Trees and plants		
𓆭	M1; U+131AD	tree	Charm (jmꜣ); Sycamore (nht); Bright (bꜣq); (A tree) (nꜥrt)	m, jmꜣ, jm	
𓆮	M1A; U+131AE	combination of tree and branch	After, following (m-ḫt)		
𓆯	M1B; U+131AF	combination of tree and horned viper	Within him/it (jm.f); (A kind of tree) (nḏft); (A kind of tree) (ꜣtf)		
𓆰	M2; U+131B0	plant	True of Voice (mꜣꜥ-ḫrw)	ḥn, js, j (cryptographic)	1. Determinative for various plants or flowers 2. Two phonemes for "cane", and "canes", ḥn-(from ḥnj), js-(from jsw).; 3. flower (garland), plant, branch, seed 4. Rosetta Stone, line R12, The people shall wear garlands on their heads, shall be made festal...
𓆱	M3; U+131B1	branch	Wood (ḫt); Throughout (ḫt)	ḫt	
𓆲	M3A; U+131B2	combination of owl and branch	After, following (m-ḫt)		
𓆳	M4; U+131B3	palm branch	Year (rnpt); Young (rnp); time (tr)	rnp, tr	
𓆴	M5; U+131B4	combination of palm branch and flat loaf	Year (rnpt); time (tr)	tr	
𓆵	M6; U+131B5	combination of palm branch and mouth (D21)		tr	
𓆶	M7; U+131B6	combination of palm branch and stool	Young (rnp)	rnp	
𓆷	M8; U+131B7	pool with lotus flowers	Field, Inundation season (ꜣḫt); Field (šꜣ)	šꜣ	1. Ideogram & Phoneme for šꜣ, "flooded country" 2. Ideogram for ꜣḫt, Season of the Inundation
𓆸	M9; U+131B8	lotus flower	Lotus (sšn, snšn, nḫb); Beautiful (nfr)		A. Ideogram or det. in sšn, lotus flower; B. Greek language 'souson'; C. also det. for snšn, for lily, lotus
𓆹	M10; U+131B9	lotus bud with straight stem	Lotus bud (nḥbt)		
𓆺	M10A; U+131BA	lotus bud with winding stem			
𓆻	M11; U+131BB	flower on long twisted stalk	Offer (wdn); Divert, revert (wḏb)		
𓆼	M12; U+131BC	one lotus plant	1,000 (ḫꜣ)	ḫꜣ	Ideogram for ḫꜣ, a part of the lotus; phonetically used for ḫꜣ; in Egyptian mathematics, 1,000: (see also ksj, bow, bend, do homage, etc., for ḫꜣ-ꜣ-b)
𓆽	M12A; U+131BD	two lotus plants	2,000		
𓆾	M12B; U+131BE	three lotus plants	3,000		
𓆿	M12C; U+131BF	four lotus plants	4,000		
𓇀	M12D; U+131C0	five lotus plants	5,000		
𓇁	M12E; U+131C1	six lotus plants	6,000		
𓇂	M12F; U+131C2	seven lotus plants	7,000		
𓇃	M12G; U+131C3	eight lotus plants	8,000		
𓇄	M12H; U+131C4	nine lotus plants	9,000		
𓇅	M13; U+131C5	papyrus stem	Fresh, green, raw (wꜣḏ); Lower Egypt (mḥw)		Tril. wꜣḏ
𓇆	M14; U+131C6	combination of papyrus and cobra	Fresh, green, raw (wꜣḏ)		
𓇇	M15; U+131C7	clump of papyrus with buds	Lower Egypt (mḥw); Around (ḥꜣ)	ḥꜣ, ꜣḫ (in ꜣḫ-bjt “Chemmis”)	
𓇈	M15A; U+131C8	combination of clump of papyrus with buds and village	Lower Egypt (mḥw)		
𓇉	M16; U+131C9	clump of papyrus	Lower Egypt (mḥw); Around (ḥꜣ)	ḥꜣ, ꜣḫ (in ꜣḫ-bjt “Chemmis”)	
𓇊	M16A; U+131CA	combination of clump of papyrus and village	Lower Egypt (mḥw)		
𓇋	M17; U+131CB	reed	Reed (j); I, me, my (.j)	j	Alphabetic uniliteral vowel j
𓇌	M17A; U+131CC	two reeds		y, j	Alphabetic uniliteral vowel y
𓇍	M18; U+131CD	combination of reed (M17) and legs walking (D54)	Come (jj)		
𓇎	M19; U+131CE	heaped conical cakes between reed (M17) and club	Pleasing (ꜥꜣb); Offerings, provisions (ꜥꜣbt)		
𓇏	M20; U+131CF	field of reeds	Field (sḫt); Help (sm)	sm	
𓇐	M21; U+131D0	reeds with root	Help (sm)	sm	
𓇑	M22; U+131D1	rush	El Kab (nḫb); Nekhbet (She of El Kab) (nḫbt)	n	Possibly ancestral to Proto-Sinaitic Tsade and its descendants
𓇒	M22A; U+131D2	two rushes	This, that (nn)	nn	proximal demonstrative "this, that"
𓇓	M23; U+131D3	sedge	Sedge (swt); King (nswt); Upper Egypt(ian) (šmꜥw); South, Southern (rs, rsj, šmꜥw)	sw	See nswt-bjt
𓇔	M24; U+131D4	combination of sedge (M23) and mouth (D21)	South, Southern (rs, rsj, rsw)		Alternate version of M25 𓇖. South
𓇕	M24A; U+131D5	lily	Upper Egypt (šmꜥw)		
𓇖	M25; U+131D6	combination of flowering sedge (M26) and mouth (D21)	South, Southern (rs, rsj, rsw)		
𓇗	M26; U+131D7	flowering sedge	Make music (šmꜥ); South, Southern, Upper Egypt(ian) (šmꜥw)	šmꜥ	Flowering rush; also Gardiner nos. M25, M27, M28, M25 M27 M28
𓇘	M27; U+131D8	combination of flowering sedge (M26) and forearm	Make music (šmꜥ); South, Southern, Upper Egypt(ian) (šmꜥw)	šmꜥ	
𓇙	M28; U+131D9	combination of flowering sedge (M26) and hobble (V20)	Upper Egyptian 10’s (mḏw-šmꜥw)		
𓇚	M28A; U+131DA	three lilies on village	Upper Egypt (šmꜥw)		
𓇛	M29; U+131DB	Carob seed-pod	Carob (nḏm); Sweet (nḏm)	nḏm	
𓇜	M30; U+131DC	root	Date (bnr); Sweet (bnr)		Ideogram or det. for bnr, sweet, date; for Egyptian language bnrjt, sweetness, a favor, anything sweet, pleasant or nice; for bnryty, the 'confectioner'
𓇝	M31; U+131DD	rhizome	Prosper (rwḏ)	rwḏ	
𓇞	M31A; U+131DE	tree in vase			
𓇟	M32; U+131DF	rhizome	Prosper (rwḏ)	rwḏ	
𓇠	M33; U+131E0	3 grains horizontally	Barley (jt)		
𓇡	M33A; U+131E1	3 grains vertically	Barley (jt)		
𓇢	M33B; U+131E2	3 grains in triangular arrangement	Barley (jt)		
𓇣	M34; U+131E3	ear of emmer	Emmer (bdt)		
𓇤	M35; U+131E4	stack (of grain)	Pile, stack (ꜥḥꜥ, ꜥḥꜥw)		
𓇥	M36; U+131E5	bundle of flax	End, limit (ḏr)	ḏr	
𓇦	M37; U+131E6	bundle of flax	End, limit (ḏr)	ḏr	
𓇧	M38; U+131E7	wide bundle of flax	Bind together (dmꜣ)		
𓇨	M39; U+131E8	basket of fruit or grain	End, limit (ḏr); Bind together (dmꜣ)	ḏr	
𓇩	M40; U+131E9	bundle of reeds	Gang (of workmen (js)	js	
𓇪	M40A; U+131EA	bundle of reeds		js	
𓇫	M41; U+131EB	piece of wood	Juniper (wꜥn); Cedar (ꜥš)		
𓇬	M42; U+131EC	flower	Eat (wnm); Be, exist (wn)	wn	
𓇭	M43; U+131ED	vine on trellis	Wine (jrp); Vintner, Gardener (kꜣny)		
𓇮	M44; U+131EE	thorn	Sharp (spd); Thorn (srt)		
	N		Sky, earth, water		
𓇯	N1; U+131EF	sky	Sky, heaven (pt); Above (ḥry)		
𓇰	N2; U+131F0	sky with sceptre	Darkness (kkw); Night (grḥ)		
𓇱	N3; U+131F1	sky with sceptre	Darkness (kkw); Night (grḥ)		
𓇲	N4; U+131F2	sky with rain	Dew (jꜣdt); Storm (šnyt)		
𓇳	N5; U+131F3	sun	Ra, the sun (rꜥ); Day (hrw)		
𓇴	N6; U+131F4	sun with uraeus	Ra, the sun (rꜥ); Day (hrw)		
𓇵	N7; U+131F5	combination of sun (N5) and butcher's block	Every day (ẖrt-hrw)		
𓇶	N8; U+131F6	sunshine	Shine (psḏ); Rise (wbn); Illuminate (sḥḏ); Sunfolk (of Heliopolis) (ḥnmmt)		
𓇷	N9; U+131F7	moon with lower half obscured	Primeval time (pꜣwt); Ennead (psḏt); New moon festival (psḏntyw)	psḏ	
𓇸	N10; U+131F8	moon with lower section obscured	Primeval time (pꜣwt); Ennead (psḏt); New moon festival (psḏntyw)		
𓇹	N11; U+131F9	crescent moon	Moon (jꜥḥ); Month (ꜣbd)		
𓇺	N12; U+131FA	crescent moon	Moon (jꜥḥ); Month (ꜣbd)		
𓇻	N13; U+131FB	combination of crescent moon (N12) and star (N14)	Half-month festival (smdt)		
𓇼	N14; U+131FC	star	Star (sbꜣ); Praise, adore, thank (dwꜣ); 5 (djw); God (nṯr) (Ptolemaic)	sbꜣ, dwꜣ	
𓇽	N15; U+131FD	star in circle	Duat (dwꜣt)		
𓇾	N16; U+131FE	land with grains	Land, Earth (tꜣ)		
𓇿	N17; U+131FF	land	Land, Earth (tꜣ)		Variant of N16
𓈀	N18; U+13200	sandy tract	Horizon (ꜣḫt); Island (jw); Kilt, loincloth (dꜣjw)		
𓈁	N18A; U+13201	combination of sandy tract (N18) and ripple of water (N35)	Amun (jmn) (Cryptographic)		
𓈂	N18B; U+13202	combination of roll of bread and bolt	Shenes (location) (šns)		
𓈃	N19; U+13203	two sandy tracts	Two horizons (ꜣḫty)		In rꜥ-ḥrw-ꜣḫty “Ra-Horus of the Two Horizons”
𓈄	N20; U+13204	tongue of land	Riverbank (jdb); Revert, divert (wḏb)		
𓈅	N21; U+13205	short tongue of land	Riverbank (jdb); Revert, divert (wḏb)		
𓈆	N22; U+13206	broad tongue of land	Riverbank (jdb); Revert, divert (wḏb)		
𓈇	N23; U+13207	irrigation canal			Determinative for words involving land, especially farmland
𓈈	N24; U+13208	irrigation canal system	District (spꜣt)		Base for the Nome signs (categories NL and NU)
𓈉	N25; U+13209	three hills	Foreign land (ḫꜣst)		Determinative for foreign locations
𓈊	N25A; U+1320A	three hills (low)	Foreign land (ḫꜣst)		Determinative for foreign locations
𓈋	N26; U+1320B	two hills	Mountain (ḏw)		
𓈌	N27; U+1320C	sun over mountain	Horizon (ꜣḫt)		
𓈍	N28; U+1320D	rays of sun over hill	Appear (ḫꜥj)	ḫꜥ	
𓈎	N29; U+1320E	slope of hill	Hill (qꜣꜣ)	q	Uniliteral q.
𓈏	N30; U+1320F	mound of earth	Mound (jꜣt)		
𓈐	N31; U+13210	road with shrubs	Path, way (wꜣt); Course, road (mṯn); Distant (ḥr)	ḥr	
𓈑	N32; U+13211	lump of clay	Clay (sjn)		
𓈒	N33; U+13212	grain			
𓈓	N33A; U+13213	three grains			Alternative plural marker. See Z2.
𓈔	N34; U+13214	ingot of metal	Iron (bjꜣ); Copper (ḥmt)		
𓈕	N34A; U+13215	ingot of metal			
𓈖	N35; U+13216	ripple of water	To, for (Dative preposition) (n); Of (Genitival adjective) (n[j])	n	Uniliteral n. Possibly ancestral to Proto-Sinaitic Mem and its descendants
𓈗	N35A; U+13217	three ripples of water	Water (mw)		Determinative for water and liquid
𓈘	N36; U+13218	canal	Canal (mr); Beloved [of] (mry)	mr	
𓈙	N37; U+13219	pool	Lake, pool (š)	š, ẖ (Old kingdom)	Uniliteral š.
𓈚	N37A; U+1321A	pool	Lake, pool (š)	š, ẖ (Old kingdom)	
𓈛	N38; U+1321B	deep pool	Lake, pool (š)	š, ẖ (Old kingdom)	
𓈜	N39; U+1321C	pool with water	Lake, pool (š)	š, ẖ (Old kingdom)	
𓈝	N40; U+1321D	pool with legs	Go, set out (šm)		
𓈞	N41; U+1321E	well with ripple of water	Copper (ḥmt); Metal (bjꜣ); Wife (ḥmt)	ḥm, bjꜣ	
𓈟	N42; U+1321F	well with line of water	Copper (ḥmt); Metal (bjꜣ); Wife (ḥmt)	ḥm, bjꜣ	
	NL		Lower nile		See: Lower Egyptian Nomes
𓈠	NL1; U+13220	Nome sign with wall and mace	White-Walls (jnb-ḥḏ)		1st Nome of Lower Egypt (NL001), the Memphite nome Inebu-hedj
𓈡	NL2; U+13221	Nome sign with cow thigh	Cow thigh (ḫpš)		2nd Nome of Lower Egypt (NL002)
𓈢	NL3; U+13222	Nome sign with falcon and feather	West (jmntt)		3rd Nome of Lower Egypt (NL003)
𓈣	NL4; U+13223	Nome sign with shield, crossed arrows, and sedge	Southern Neith (nt-rst)		4th Nome of Lower Egypt (NL004)
𓈤	NL5; U+13224	Nome sign with shield, crossed arrows, and papyrus plant	Northern Neith (nt-mḥt)		5th Nome of Lower Egypt (NL005)
𓈥	NL5a; U+13225	Nome sign with shield, crossed arrows, and whip upon bread loaf	Northern Neith (nt-mḥt)		5th Nome of Lower Egypt (NL005A)
𓈦	NL6; U+13226	Nome sign with mountain and bull	ḫꜣsww (Mountain bull)		6th Nome of Lower Egypt (NL006), Khaset
𓈧	NL7; U+13227	Nome sign with harpoon and West-emblem	Western harpoon (ḥww-(gs)-jmnty)		7th Nome of Lower Egypt (NL007)
𓈨	NL8; U+13228	Nome sign with harpoon and East-emblem	Eastern harpoon (ḥww-(gs)-jꜣbty)		8th Nome of Lower Egypt (NL008)
𓈩	NL9; U+13229	Nome sign with Andjety	Andjety (ꜥnḏty)		9th Nome of Lower Egypt (NL009)
𓈪	NL10; U+1322A	Nome sign with bull and crocodile skin	Black bull (kꜣ-km)		10th Nome of Lower Egypt (NL010)
𓈫	NL11; U+1322B	Nome sign with bull and pustule	Heseb-Bull (kꜣ-ḥsb)		11th Nome of Lower Egypt (NL011)
𓈬	NL12; U+1322C	Nome sign with bull and calf	Calf and Bull (ṯb-kꜣ?)		12th Nome of Lower Egypt (NL012)
𓈭	NL13; U+1322D	Nome sign with shuttle and crook	Prospering scepter (ḥqꜣ-ꜥḏ)		13th Nome of Lower Egypt (NL013), the Heliopolite nome, Heqat-Adj
𓈮	NL14; U+1322E	Nome sign with simplified jars and East-emblem	Foremost of the East (ḫnty-jꜣbty)		14th Nome of Lower Egypt (NL014)
𓈯	NL15; U+1322F	Nome sign with ibis	Thoth (ḏḥwty)		15th Nome of Lower Egypt (NL015)
𓈰	NL16; U+13230	Nome sign with fish	Hatmehit (ḥꜣt-mḥyt)		16th Nome of Lower Egypt (NL016)
𓈱	NL17; U+13231	Nome sign with tusk, hand, bread loaf, and crossroads	Throne (bḥdt)		17th Nome of Lower Egypt (NL017)
𓈲	NL17a; U+13232	Nome sign with lungs, tusk, hand, bread loaf, and crossroads	Uniting the throne (?) (smꜣ-bḥdt)		17th Nome of Lower Egypt (NL017A)
𓈳	NL18; U+13233	Nome sign with child wearing white crown and cow’s head	Southern prince (jmty-ḫnt)		18th Nome of Lower Egypt (NL018)
𓈴	NL19; U+13234	Nome sign with child wearing white crown and hindquarters of lion	Northern prince (jmty-pḥw)		19th Nome of Lower Egypt (NL019)
𓈵	NL20; U+13235	Nome sign with thorn and Sopdu	Sopdu (spdw)		20th Nome of Lower Egypt (NL020)
	NU		Upper nile		See: Upper Egyptian Nomes
𓈶	NU1; U+13236	Nome sign with land, bow, bread loaf and land	Land of the Bow (tꜣ-stj)		1st Nome of Upper Egypt (NU001), Ta-Seti
𓈷	NU2; U+13237	Nome sign with balance column and falcon	Throne of Horus (wṯst-ḥrw)		2nd Nome of Upper Egypt (NU002), Wetjes-Hor
𓈸	NU3; U+13238	Nome sign with emblem of Nekhen	Shrine (Nekhen) (nḫn)		3rd Nome of Upper Egypt (NU003), Nekhen (nome)
𓈹	NU4; U+13239	Nome sign with Was-scepter	Scepter (Waset) (wꜣst)		4th Nome of Upper Egypt (NU004)
𓈺	NU5; U+1323A	Nome sign with two falcons	Two falcons/Two gods/Two Horuses (bjkwy/nṯrwy/ḥrwy)		5th Nome of Upper Egypt (NU005), Herui
𓈻	NU6; U+1323B	Nome sign with crocodile with feather	Crocodile (jqr, msḥ?)		6th Nome of Upper Egypt (NU006), Iqer
𓈼	NU7; U+1323C	Nome sign with Sistrum	Bat (bꜣt); Sistrum (sšš)		7th Nome of Upper Egypt (NU007)
𓈽	NU8; U+1323D	Nome sign with Osiris fetish	Great land (tꜣ-wr)		8th Nome of Upper Egypt (NU008), the Thinite nome, Ta-wer
𓈾	NU9; U+1323E	Nome sign with emblem of Min	Min (mnw)		9th Nome of Upper Egypt (NU009)
𓈿	NU10; U+1323F	Nome sign with cobra with feather	Wadjet (wꜣḏyt)		10th Nome of Upper Egypt (NU010), Wadjet
𓉀	NU10a; U+13240	Nome sign with papyrus column, cobra, and bread loaf	Wadjet (wꜣḏyt)		10th Nome of Upper Egypt (NU010A), Wadjet
𓉁	NU11; U+13241	Nome sign with Set-animal	Set-animal (šꜣ)		11th Nome of Upper Egypt (NU011)
𓉂	NU11a; U+13242	Nome sign with wick, Red crown, ripples of water	Set-animal (šꜣ)		11th Nome of Upper Egypt (NU011A)
𓉃	NU12; U+13243	Nome sign with mountain and viper	Viper mountain (ḏw-ft)		12th Nome of Upper Egypt (NU012)
𓉄	NU13; U+13244	Nome sign with tree crossed by viper and simplified jars	Southern ꜣtf/nḏft-tree (ꜣtf-ḫntt/nḏft-ḫntt)		13th Nome of Upper Egypt (NU013)
𓉅	NU14; U+13245	Nome sign with tree crossed by viper, hindquarters of lion, bread loaf	Northern ꜣtf/nḏft-tree (ꜣtf-pḥt/nḏft-ḫntt)		14th Nome of Upper Egypt (NU014)
𓉆	NU15; U+13246	Nome sign with hare	Hare (wnt)		15th Nome of Upper Egypt (NU015), Wenet
𓉇	NU16; U+13247	Nome sign with oryx	Oryx (mꜣ-ḥḏ)		16th Nome of Upper Egypt (NU016), Ma-hedj
𓉈	NU17; U+13248	Nome sign with jackal	Jackal (Anubis, Anput) (jnpw(t))		17th Nome of Upper Egypt (NU017)
𓉉	NU18; U+13249	Nome sign with falcon, wings spread	Nemty (nmty)		18th Nome of Upper Egypt (NU018)
𓉊	NU18a; U+1324A	Nome sign with falcon on boat	Nemty (nmty)		18th Nome of Upper Egypt (NU018A)
𓉋	NU19; U+1324B	Nome sign with two Was-scepters and foot	Wabwi, Two Scepters? (wꜣbwy)		19th Nome of Upper Egypt (NU019)
𓉌	NU20; U+1324C	Nome sign with tree and simplified jars	Southern nꜥrt-tree (nꜥrt-ḫntt)		20th Nome of Upper Egypt (NU020)
𓉍	NU21; U+1324D	Nome sign with tree, hindquarters of a lion, and bread loaf	Northern nꜥrt-tree (nꜥrt-pḥt)		21st Nome of Upper Egypt (NU021)
𓉎	NU22; U+1324E	Nome sign with knife	Knife (mdnjt)		22nd Nome of Upper Egypt (NU022)
𓉏	NU22a; U+1324F				22nd Nome of Upper Egypt (NU022A)
	O		Buildings, parts of buildings, etc.		
𓉐	O1; U+13250	house	House (pr)	pr	Determinative for buildings Possibly ancestral to Proto-Sinaitic Bet and its descendants.
𓉑	O1A; U+13251	combination of house and ankh	House of Life (Scriptorium) (pr-ꜥnḫ)		
𓉒	O2; U+13252	combination of house and mace with round head	Treasury (pr-ḥḏ)		
𓉓	O3; U+13253	combination of house, oar, tall loaf and beer jug	Voice-offering (prt-ḫrw)		
𓉔	O4; U+13254	shelter	Courtyard (h)	h	Egyptian uniliteral sign h
𓉕	O5; U+13255	winding wall from upper-left corner	Avenue (mrrt)	mr	
𓉖	O5A; U+13256	winding wall from lower-left corner	Avenue (mrrt)	mr	
𓉗	O6; U+13257	enclosure	House, mansion (ḥwt)		
𓉘	O6A; U+13258	opening of ḥwt-enclosure			Egyptological sign used for placing groups of signs inside a ḥwt-enclosure
𓉙	O6B; U+13259	opening of ḥwt-enclosure			Egyptological sign used for placing groups of signs inside a ḥwt-enclosure
𓉚	O6C; U+1325A	opening of ḥwt-enclosure			Egyptological sign used for placing groups of signs inside a ḥwt-enclosure
𓉛	O6D; U+1325B	closing of ḥwt-enclosure			Egyptological sign used for placing groups of signs inside a ḥwt-enclosure
𓉜	O6E; U+1325C	closing of ḥwt-enclosure			Egyptological sign used for placing groups of signs inside a ḥwt-enclosure
𓉝	O6F; U+1325D	closing of ḥwt-enclosure			Egyptological sign used for placing groups of signs inside a ḥwt-enclosure
𓉞	O7; U+1325E	combination of enclosure and flat loaf	House, mansion (ḥwt)		
𓉟	O8; U+1325F	combination of enclosure, flat loaf and wooden column	Great house (ḥwt-ꜥꜣt) (Not to be confused with pr-ꜥꜣ)		
𓉠	O9; U+13260	combination of enclosure, flat loaf and basket	Nephthys (nbt-ḥwt)		
𓉡	O10; U+13261	combination of enclosure and falcon	Hathor (ḥwt-ḥrw)		
𓉢	O10A; U+13262	combination of enclosure and ankh	House of Life (ḥwt-ꜥnḫ) (Not to be confused with pr-ꜥnḫ)		
𓉣	O10B; U+13263	combination of enclosure and bee	House of the king of Lower Egypt (ḥwt-bjty)		
𓉤	O10C; U+13264	combination of shrine in profile and face			
𓉥	O11; U+13265	palace	Palace (ꜥḥ)		
𓉦	O12; U+13266	combination of palace and forearm	Palace (ꜥḥ)		
𓉧	O13; U+13267	battlemented enclosure	Portal (sbḫt); Wide (wsḫ); Wide hall (wsḫt)		
𓉨	O14; U+13268	part of battlemented enclosure	Portal (sbḫt)		
𓉩	O15; U+13269	enclosure with cup and flat loaf	Wide hall (wsḫt)		
𓉪	O16; U+1326A	gateway with serpents	Gate (rwt); Shroud, door (tꜣyt)		
𓉫	O17; U+1326B	open gateway with serpents	Gate (rwt); Shroud, door (tꜣyt)		
𓉬	O18; U+1326C	shrine in profile	Shrine (kꜣrj)		
𓉭	O19; U+1326D	shrine with fence	Shrine (jtrt); Great House (archaic shrine of El Kab and Upper Egypt) (pr-wr)		
𓉮	O19A; U+1326E	shrine	Shrine (jtrt); Great House (archaic shrine of El Kab and Upper Egypt) (pr-wr)		
𓉯	O20; U+1326F	shrine	Shrine (jtrt); House of the Jar (archaic shrine of Buto) and Lower Egypt (pr-nw)		
𓉰	O20A; U+13270	shrine	Shrine (jtrt); House of the Jar (archaic shrine of Buto) and Lower Egypt (pr-nw)		
𓉱	O21; U+13271	façade of shrine	Booth (sḥ)		
𓉲	O22; U+13272	booth with pole	Booth (sḥ); Festival (ḥ(ꜣ)b)	ꜥrq	
𓉳	O23; U+13273	double platform	Sed festival (ḥ(ꜣ)b-sd)		
𓉴	O24; U+13274	pyramid	Pyramid (mr)		
𓉵	O24A; U+13275	pedestal of sun temple	Ascend (jꜥ(r))		
𓉶	O25; U+13276	obelisk	Obelisk (tḫn); Monument (mn)		
𓉷	O25A; U+13277	obelisk and pedestal of sun temple			determinative for Sun temples
𓉸	O26; U+13278	stela	Stela (ꜥḥꜥw); Decree (wḏ)		
𓉹	O27; U+13279	hall of columns	Office (ḫꜣ)		
𓉺	O28; U+1327A	column	Column (jwn)	jwn	
𓉻	O29; U+1327B	horizontal wooden column	Column (ꜥꜣ); Great (esp. of size) (ꜥꜣ)	ꜥꜣ	
𓉼	O29A; U+1327C	vertical wooden column	Column (ꜥꜣ); Great (esp. of size) (ꜥꜣ)	ꜥꜣ	
𓉽	O30; U+1327D	support	Post, support (sḫnt)		
𓉾	O30A; U+1327E	four supports	The 4 supports of the sky (sḫnt)		
𓉿	O31; U+1327F	door	Door (ꜥꜣ)		
𓊀	O32; U+13280	gateway	Gate (sbꜣ)		
𓊁	O33; U+13281	façade of palace	Palace (srḫ)		See: Serekh
𓊂	O33A; U+13282	closing of srḫ-enclosure			Egyptological sign used in the horizontal writing of the Horus name (see: Serekh)
𓊃	O34; U+13283	door bolt	Doorbolt (s)	s	Unil. s, used for horizontal spaces instead of the vertical s-sign S29, a folded cloth, S29
𓊄	O35; U+13284	combination of bolt and legs	Go (sj)	sj, sb	alone translates to "go!", can also be used in zbj, "perish".
𓊅	O36; U+13285	wall	Wall (jnb)		1. Ideogram or det. for jnb, "wall"; 2. (a det. for related words)
𓊆	O36A; U+13286	opening of oval fortified wall enclosure			Egyptological sign used to enclose groups of signs in a fortified wall
𓊇	O36B; U+13287	closing of oval fortified wall enclosure			Egyptological sign used to enclose groups of signs in a fortified wall
𓊈	O36C; U+13288	opening of square fortified wall enclosure			Egyptological sign used to enclose groups of signs in a fortified wall
𓊉	O36D; U+13289	closure of square fortified wall enclosure			Egyptological sign used to enclose groups of signs in a fortified wall
𓊊	O37; U+1328A	falling wall	Tilt, favor (gsꜣ); Demolish (sẖnn)		
𓊋	O38; U+1328B	corner of wall	Corner, angle, court of magistrates (qnbt); Gateway (ꜥrrt)		
𓊌	O39; U+1328C	stone	Stone (jnr)		Determinative for types of stone
𓊍	O40; U+1328D	stair single	Throne, stairs (ḫndw)		
𓊎	O41; U+1328E	double stairway	Ascend (jꜥ(r))		1.
𓊏	O42; U+1328F	fence	Palm (šsp); Receive (šsp)	šsp	
𓊐	O43; U+13290	low fence	Palm (šsp); Receive (šsp)	šsp	
𓊑	O44; U+13291	emblem of Min	Office, position (jꜣt)		Fetish of the Temple of Min
𓊒	O45; U+13292	domed building	Harem, temple chamber (jpt)		
𓊓	O46; U+13293	domed building	Harem, temple chamber (jpt)		
𓊔	O47; U+13294	enclosed mound	Nekhen (nḫn)		
𓊕	O48; U+13295	enclosed mound	Nekhen (nḫn); Twice, doubled (sp-snw)		
𓊖	O49; U+13296	village	Town (njwt); Buto (p)		Determinative for towns, locations within Egypt
𓊗	O50; U+13297	threshing floor	Threshing floor (spt); Time, occasion, etc. (sp)	sp	
𓊘	O50A; U+13298	hieratic threshing floor			
𓊙	O50B; U+13299	O50A reversed			
𓊚	O51; U+1329A	pile of grain	Granary (šnwt)		
	P		Ships and parts of ships		
𓊛	P1; U+1329B		ship, boat (dpt, jmw); Ships (ꜥhꜥw); sail, go downstream (ḫdj)	jm	
𓊜	P1A; U+1329C	boat upside down	Turn over (pnꜥ)		
𓊝	P2; U+1329D	ship under sail	sail upstream (ḫntj)		
𓊞	P3; U+1329E	sacred barque	Ferry, traverse (ḏꜣj); sacred barque (wiꜣ)		
𓊟	P3A; U+1329F	sacred barque without steering oar	sacred barque (wiꜣ)		
𓊠	P4; U+132A0	boat with net	Release (wḥꜥ); Fisherman, fowler (wḥꜥ)		
𓊡	P5; U+132A1	sail	sail (ṯꜣwt); sailor (nfw), wind, breath (ṯꜣw); north wind (mḥyt)		
𓊢	P6; U+132A2	mast	mast (ꜥḥꜥ); to stand (ꜥḥꜥ)	ꜥḥꜥ	Triliteral ꜥḥꜥ, "to erect, stand,", related concepts
𓊣	P7; U+132A3	combination of mast and forearm	to stand (ꜥḥꜥ)	ꜥḥꜥ, ꜥḥꜥw	Combination of P6 and D36
𓊤	P8; U+132A4	oar	oar (wsr); Voice (ḫrw)		
𓊥	P9; U+132A5	combination of oar and horned viper	says (parenthetic) (ḫrwfj)		Combination of P8 and I9
𓊦	P10; U+132A6	rudder	steering oar (ḥmw)		
𓊧	P11; U+132A7	mooring post	mooring post (m(j)njt)	qd	
	Q		Domestic and funerary furniture		
𓊨	Q1; U+132A8	seat throne	Seat, place (st)	st, js, ws (in wsjr, “Osiris”), ḥtm	
𓊩	Q2; U+132A9	carrying chair	Seat, place (st)	ws (in wsjr, “Osiris”)	
𓊪	Q3; U+132AA	stool	Base, mat, stool (p); Buto (p)	p	Uniliteral p.
𓊫	Q4; U+132AB	headrest	Headrest (wrs)		A. Determinative for wrs', the "headrest"; B. headrest is also Egyptian language, wꜣrst, wA rw Aa18 Z1 M3 t Z1 (Coptic language, "ⲟⲩⲣⲁⲥ"). C. See also: WikiCommons: Egyptian headrests
𓊬	Q5; U+132AC	chest	box (hn)		
𓊭	Q6; U+132AD	sarcophagus	coffin, burial (qrst), bury (qrs)		
𓊮	Q7; U+132AE	brazier	fire, flame (nsr(sr)); torch (tkꜣ); cook (psj); warmth (srf); Lamp (ḫꜣbs)		Ideogram and determinative for various words related to fire, warmth, burning
	R		Temple furniture and sacred emblems		
𓊯	R1; U+132AF	high table with offerings	offering table (ḫꜣwt); Offerings (wdḥw); Offering, satisfy (ḥtp)		
𓊰	R2; U+132B0	table with slices of bread	offering table (ḫꜣwt)		
𓊱	R2A; U+132B1	high table with offerings	offering table (ḫꜣwt)		
𓊲	R3; U+132B2	low table with offerings	offering table (ḫꜣwt); Offerings (wdḥw); Offering, satisfy (ḥtp)		
𓊳	R3A; U+132B3	low table	offering table (ḫꜣwt); Offerings (wdḥw); Offering, satisfy (ḥtp)		
𓊴	R3B; U+132B4	low table with offerings (simplified)			
𓊵	R4; U+132B5	loaf on mat	Altar, offering, peace, be satisfied, be at peace, rest, set (of the sun) ((ḥtp)		
𓊶	R5; U+132B6	narrow censer	Cense, fumigate (kꜣp)		
𓊷	R6; U+132B7	broad censer	Cense, fumigate (kꜣp)		
𓊸	R7; U+132B8	bowl with smoke	Incense (snṯr); Ba-soul (bꜣ)		
𓊹	R8; U+132B9	Cloth on pole	God (nṯr)		
𓊺	R9; U+132BA	combination of cloth on pole and bag	Natron (bd, nṯry)		
𓊻	R10; U+132BB	combination of cloth on pole, butcher's block and slope of hill	Necropolis (ẖrt-nṯr)		
𓊼	R10A; U+132BC	combination of cloth on pole and butcher's block	Necropolis (ẖrt-nṯr)		
𓊽	R11; U+132BD	reed column	Be stable (ḏd)		Djed, a symbol of Osiris- originally probably a reed column, later reinterpreted as a spinal column
𓊾	R12; U+132BE	standard	Standard (jꜣt)		
𓊿	R13; U+132BF	falcon and feather on standard	West (jmnty, jmntt)		
𓋀	R14; U+132C0	Emblem of the West	West (jmnty, jmntt); '"right"' (wnmj)		Emblem of the West
𓋁	R15; U+132C1	spear, Emblem of the East	East (jꜣbty, jꜣbtt); Left (jꜣbj)		Emblem of the East
𓋂	R16; U+132C2	sceptre with feathers and string	Wekh-fetish of Nefertem (wḫ)		
𓋃	R16A; U+132C3	sceptre with feathers	Wekh-fetish (wḫ)		Wekh-fetish of Nefertem
𓋄	R17; U+132C4	wig on pole	Great Land (8th nome of Upper Egypt) (tꜣ-wr)		Abydine fetish of Osiris. See also NU8, 8th nome of Upper Egypt
𓋅	R18; U+132C5	combination of wig on pole and irrigation canal system	Great Land (8th nome of Upper Egypt) (tꜣ-wr)		Abydine fetish of Osiris. See also NU8, 8th nome of Upper Egypt
𓋆	R19; U+132C6	scepter with feather	Waset (Thebes (wꜣst); Iatet (A milk goddess) (jꜣtt)		Emblem of Waset (Thebes)
𓋇	R20; U+132C7	flower with horns	Seshat (sšꜣt, sẖꜣt)		Emblem of Seshat
𓋈	R21; U+132C8	flower with horns	Seshat (sšꜣt, sẖꜣt)		Emblem of Seshat
𓋉	R22; U+132C9	two narrow belemnites	Min (mnw); Shrine (ḫm); Letopolis (ḫm)		Emblem of Min. Interpreted as belemnite fossils or a lightning bolt.
𓋊	R23; U+132CA	two broad belemnites	Min (mnw); Shrine (ḫm); Letopolis (ḫm)		Emblem of Min. Interpreted as belemnite fossils or a lightning bolt.
𓋋	R24; U+132CB	two bows tied horizontally	Neith (nt)		Emblem of Neith. Alternatively interpreted as a weaver’s shuttle or a simplified Click beetle.
𓋌	R25; U+132CC	two bows tied vertically	Neith (nt)		Emblem of Neith. Alternatively interpreted as a weaver’s shuttle or a simplified Click beetle.
𓋍	R26; U+132CD	combination of land, lung and windpipe, lily, and papyrus	To unite the two lands (smꜣ-tꜣwy)		’Sema-Tawy’, heraldic symbol of the unification of the two lands. See: Sema Tawy
𓋎	R27; U+132CE	two arrows crossed over a shield	Neith (nt)		Emblem of Neith
𓋏	R28; U+132CF	Bat	Bat (bꜣt)		
𓋐	R29; U+132D0	niche with serpent	Shrine (jtrt), in jtrty “Double shrines”		
	S		Crowns, dress, staves, etc.		
𓋑	S1; U+132D1	white crown	White crown (ḥḏt, wrt, wrrt); Beautiful, good (nfr) (Ptolemaic); Kingship (nsyt); King( of Upper Egypt) (nswt); Upper Egypt(ian) (šmꜥw)		See Hedjet; (see also Red crown & Pschent)
𓋒	S2; U+132D2	combination of white crown and basket	White crown (ḥḏt, wrt, wrrt)		
𓋓	S2A; U+132D3	combination of white crown and village	Upper Egypt(ian) (šmꜥw)		
𓋔	S3; U+132D4	red crown	Red crown (dšrt, nt); King (of Lower Egypt) (bjty); Lower Egypt(ian), North (mḥw)	n, jn	See Deshret; Red crown (hieroglyph)-(uniliteral n- used in vertical spaces instead of the flat n-sign N35
𓋕	S4; U+132D5	combination of red crown and basket	Red crown (dšrt, nt); King (of Lower Egypt) (bjty)		
𓋖	S5; U+132D6	Pschent Crown	Double crown (sḫmty) (lit. ‘two powers’); Upper and Lower Egypt (šmꜥw-mḥw); Dual king (nswt-bjty)		See: Pschent, derived from late Egyptian pꜣ-sḫmty “The double crown”
𓋗	S6; U+132D7	combination of Pschent Crown and basket	Double crown (sḫmty) (lit. ‘two powers’); Dual king (nswt-bjty)		
𓋘	S6A; U+132D8	combination of red crown and village	Lower Egypt(ian), North (mḥw)		
𓋙	S7; U+132D9	blue crown	Khepresh (ḫprš)		khepresh-helmet, a.k.a. the “Blue crown” or “War crown”
𓋚	S8; U+132DA	Atef crown	Atef (ꜣtf)		
𓋛	S9; U+132DB	shuty-crown (two falcon feathers)]	shuty-crown (šwty)		two feathers, a crown related to Amun
𓋜	S10; U+132DC	headband	Fillet (mḏḥ)		
𓋝	S11; U+132DD	broad collar	Broad collar (wsḫ)		see: Usekh collar
𓋞	S12; U+132DE	collar of beads	Gold (nbw); Lord (nb) (Ptolemaic)		
𓋟	S13; U+132DF	combination of collar of beads and foot	Gold (nbw); Lord (nb) (Ptolemaic)		
𓋠	S14; U+132E0	combination of collar of beads and mace with round head	Silver (ḥḏ)		
𓋡	S14A; U+132E1	combination of collar of beads and sceptre	Electrum (ḏꜥm)		
𓋢	S14B; U+132E2	combination of collar of beads and sceptre	Electrum (ḏꜥm)		
𓋣	S15; U+132E3	pectoral	Sparkle, gleam, glitter (ṯḥn); Faience (ṯḥnt)		
𓋤	S16; U+132E4		Sparkle, gleam, glitter (ṯḥn); Faience (ṯḥnt); Malachite (šsmt)		
𓋥	S17; U+132E5	pectoral	Sparkle, gleam, glitter (ṯḥn); Faience (ṯḥnt); Malachite (šsmt)		
𓋦	S17A; U+132E6	girdle	Malachite (šsmt)		
𓋧	S18; U+132E7	"menat necklace and counterpoise"	Menat (mnjt)		Menat necklace
𓋨	S19; U+132E8	seal with necklace	Seal (ḫtm); Seal-bearer (sḏꜣwty)		Seal with necklace
𓋩	S20; U+132E9	necklace with seal	Seal (ḫtm); Seal-bearer (sḏꜣwty)		
𓋪	S21; U+132EA	ring	Ring (jwꜥw)		
𓋫	S22; U+132EB	shoulder-knot	Shoot (stj); Shesmetet (šsmtt)	sṯ, st, tꜣ-wr	
𓋬	S23; U+132EC	two whips with shen ring	Bring together, collect (dmḏ)		
𓋭	S24; U+132ED	girdle knot	Bind, tie (ṯs)	ṯs	1. knot; to tie in a knot, fetter; 2. Bil. ṯs
𓋮	S25; U+132EE	garment with ties	Foreigner (ꜣꜥꜥ, jꜥꜣw)		
𓋯	S26; U+132EF	apron	Shendyt kilt (šndyt/šnḏyt)		
𓋰	S26A; U+132F0	apron			
𓋱	S26B; U+132F1	apron			
𓋲	S27; U+132F2	cloth with two strands	Linen (mnḫt)		
𓋳	S28; U+132F3	cloth with fringe on top and folded cloth	Clothes, to clothe (ḥbs); 'Be naked (ḥꜣy)	s (Cryptographic)	
𓋴	S29; U+132F4	folded cloth	She, her, hers (.s) (Suffix pronoun)	s	Uniliteral s.
𓋵	S30; U+132F5	combination of folded cloth and horned viper		sf	
𓋶	S31; U+132F6	combination of folded cloth and sickle	Slaughter (smꜣ)	smꜣ	
𓋷	S32; U+132F7	cloth with fringe on the side	Perceive (sjꜣ); Sia (sjꜣ)		
𓋸	S33; U+132F8	sandal	Sandal (ṯb)		
𓋹	S34; U+132F9	life ankh, possibly representing a sandal-strap	Life, to live (ꜥnḫ)		
𓋺	S35; U+132FA	sunshade	Shadow, shade, sunshade (ḫꜣbyt, šwt); Standard (sryt)		
𓋻	S35A; U+132FB	sunshade	Shadow, shade, sunshade (ḫꜣbyt, šwt); Standard (sryt)		
𓋼	S36; U+132FC	sunshade	Shadow, shade, sunshade (ḫꜣbyt, šwt); Standard (sryt)		
𓋽	S37; U+132FD	fan	Fan (ḫw); Protect (ḫwj)		
𓋾	S38; U+132FE	crook	Rule, ruler (ḥqꜣ); Scepter (ḥqꜣt)		
𓋿	S39; U+132FF	shepherd's crook	Crook, scepter (ꜥwt)		
𓌀	S40; U+13300	wꜣs scepter (uꜣs)	Power, dominion (wꜣs); Iatet (a milk goddess) (jꜣtt)		See Was scepter
𓌁	S41; U+13301	sceptre	Electrum (ḏꜥm)		
𓌂	S42; U+13302	Sekhem scepter	Power, force (sḫm); ḫrp-scepter, control, direct (ḫrp); ꜥbꜣ-scepter (ꜥbꜣ)		see: Sekhem scepter
𓌃	S43; U+13303	walking stick	Speak, word(s) (md(w)); Staff (mdw)		
𓌄	S44; U+13304	walking stick with flagellum	Club, mace, ꜣms-scepter (ꜣms)		
𓌅	S45; U+13305	flagellum	Flail (nḫꜣḫꜣ)		
𓌆	S46; U+13306	covering for head and neck		k (Ptolemaic)	
	T		Warfare, hunting, butchery		
𓌇	T1; U+13307	mace with flat head			
𓌈	T2; U+13308	mace with round head			
𓌉	T3; U+13309	mace with round head	ḥḏ		Ideogram, and phonogram for mace, ḥḏ Possibly ancestral to Proto-Sinaitic Waw and its descendants
𓌊	T3A; U+1330A	combination of mace with round head and two hills			
𓌋	T4; U+1330B	mace with strap			
𓌌	T5; U+1330C	combination of mace with round head and cobra			
𓌍	T6; U+1330D	combination of mace with round head and two cobras			
𓌎	T7; U+1330E	axe			
𓌏	T7A; U+1330F	axe			
𓌐	T8; U+13310	dagger	tp		"top", or "first" "first", "foremost" Ideogram in tp, tpy; det. in mtpnt
𓌑	T8A; U+13311	dagger			
𓌒	T9; U+13312	bow	pḏ		To stretch, to extend, to be wide
𓌓	T9A; U+13313	bow	pḏ		To stretch, to extend, to be wide
𓌔	T10; U+13314	composite bow			
𓌕	T11; U+13315	arrow			
𓌖	T11A; U+13316	two crossed arrows			
𓌗	T12; U+13317	bowstring	rwḏ		1. Tril. rwḏ; Ideo. for "bowstring" 2. items that are "hard, durable, strong, rooted," thus "growth, growing" 3. (see Pharaoh Rudamun)
𓌘	T13; U+13318	joined pieces of wood	rs		phonogram, rs
𓌙	T14; U+13319	throw stick vertically			Possibly ancestral to Proto-Sinaitic Gimel and its descendants.
𓌚	T15; U+1331A	throw stick slanted			
𓌛	T16; U+1331B	scimitar			
𓌜	T16A; U+1331C	scimitar			
𓌝	T17; U+1331D	chariot	wrrt		Ideogram or det. for chariot
𓌞	T18; U+1331E	crook with package attached		šms	Follower sign
𓌟	T19; U+1331F	harpoon head	gn		"memorial, record, archive, memorandum"; in plural: "annals"
𓌠	T20; U+13320	harpoon head			
𓌡	T21; U+13321	harpoon	wꜥ (bil.)		1. "single" items; "1", 'each', etc.; 2. Bil. wꜥ
𓌢	T22; U+13322	arrowhead	sn		Bil. sn; Ideo. for "arrow" used for: brother, husband sister, wife "smell" touch, grasp 2, "second", 'the same'-(twin), two, both, etc.
𓌣	T23; U+13323	arrowhead			
𓌤	T24; U+13324	fishingnet	iꜥḥ		See moon, (also iꜥh); A. plough, break ground; B. field laborer, peasant; C. field; D. det. in name of a god "I'h-ur"-(I'h-Great)
𓌥	T25; U+13325	float	ḏb ḏbꜣ		to supply, furnish with, equip, provide, & to decorate...(thus the "life preserver") see also: seal, (to seal, ḏbꜥj-t)
𓌦	T26; U+13326	birdtrap			
𓌧	T27; U+13327	trap	sḫt		1. trap, bird-trap, (the device); 2. Ideogram or det. in sḫt, Egyptian "trap" and related words
𓌨	T28; U+13328	butcher's block	ẖr		1. Bil. ẖr; 2. Ideas of items below, (butchered, segmented, then 'owned'); and major use of 'below', or 'under', as a prepositional use
𓌩	T29; U+13329	butcher's block with knife			
𓌪	T30; U+1332A	knife	šꜥ		
𓌫	T31; U+1332B	knife-sharpener			phonogram for sšm
𓌬	T32; U+1332C	combination of knife-sharpener and legs			
𓌭	T32A; U+1332D	combination of knife and folded cloth			
𓌮	T33; U+1332E	knife-sharpener of butcher			
𓌯	T33A; U+1332F	combination of knife-sharpener and folded cloth			
𓌰	T34; U+13330	butcher's knife	nm		bil. nm
𓌱	T35; U+13331	butcher's knife			
𓌲	T36; U+13332	shield			
	U		Agriculture, crafts, and professions		
𓌳	U1; U+13333	sickle			
𓌴	U2; U+13334	sickle			
𓌵	U3; U+13335				
𓌶	U4; U+13336	mꜣꜥ			
𓌷	U5; U+13337				
𓌸	U6; U+13338				phonogram for "mr"
𓌹	U6A; U+13339				
𓌺	U6B; U+1333A				
𓌻	U7; U+1333B	hoe	mr		1. bil. mr, for "beloved" 2. used in Pharaoh, individuals, other names, etc.: (Pharaoh XX, Beloved of God/Goddess YY)
𓌼	U8; U+1333C				
𓌽	U9; U+1333D				
𓌾	U10; U+1333E	grain measure (with plural, for grain particles)	dbḥ		
𓌿	U11; U+1333F				
𓍀	U12; U+13340				
𓍁	U13; U+13341				
𓍂	U14; U+13342				
𓍃	U15; U+13343	sled (sledge)	tm		Bil. tm
𓍄	U16; U+13344	sled with jackal head	bjꜣ		bjꜣ as in wonder or marvel, or Determinative for wnš, sledge.
𓍅	U17; U+13345	Pick, opening earth	grg gr		To have, hold, possess; (used in building new town-locations)
𓍆	U18; U+13346				
𓍇	U19; U+13347			nw	
𓍈	U20; U+13348				
𓍉	U21; U+13349	adze- on-block	stp		triliteral, stp, for "chosen" often used in Pharaonic cartouche names as: "Chosen of God XXXX", (example: Beloved of Maat, Chosen of Maat) May be a combination of U19 (Adze), Z1 (singular), and N26 (mountain)
𓍊	U22; U+1334A	clapper-(of-bell) tool/instrument forked-staff, etc.	mnḫ		1. Determinative for mnḫ, for "cut", "give shape to" 2. Ideogram in mnḫ, for "to be excellent" 3. The grandfather of Ptolemy V of the Rosetta Stone is Ptolemy III Euergetes-(the Canopus Stone), the "Well-doer Gods"-(pharaohs). Their name is a composition block of two 'God' hieroglyphs-(husband & wife), (R8), R8 R8, with a chisel at the base of each, U22 R8 U22 R8
𓍋	U23; U+1334B	chisel	ꜣb mr		See: Narmer Palette bil., ꜣb, mr; (see also for mr, Canal)
𓍌	U23A; U+1334C				
𓍍	U24; U+1334D	hand drill (hieroglyph)	ḥmt		1. Ideogram in ḥmt, the name for the 'hand drill tool'; also ḥmt for words of "art", "artisan", etc.; 2. Ideo. or det. for wbꜣ, to 'rise', to 'open'; see: Rise of a Star: wbn: N8
𓍎	U25; U+1334E	version of U24 (hand drill)			
𓍏	U26; U+1334F				
𓍐	U27; U+13350				
𓍑	U28; U+13351	fire-drill	ḏꜣ (bil.)		1. bil. ḏꜣ; Ideogram for "forest" Emphatically used with words as ḏꜥḏꜥ constructs 2. (see AUS-(article), and "Scale-2"-(on list)-wḏꜣ)
𓍒	U29; U+13352				
𓍓	U29A; U+13353				
𓍔	U30; U+13354	kiln	tꜣ		Bil. tꜣ; Ideogram for "potter's kiln" (for tꜣ, see also Land, tꜣ)
𓍕	U31; U+13355				
𓍖	U32; U+13356				Determinative for smn, establish, press down, support
𓍗	U32A; U+13357				
𓍘	U33; U+13358	'pestle'-(curved top)	tj		Bil. tj
𓍙	U34; U+13359				
𓍚	U35; U+1335A		ḫsf		
𓍛	U36; U+1335B	fuller's-club	ḥm (bil.)		1. Egyptian biliteral sign ḥm, for a fuller's club; 2. Ideogram for ḥmw, 'washer', and ḥm, slave, servant; phonogram ḥm
𓍜	U37; U+1335C				
𓍝	U38; U+1335D	scale	mḫꜣt		Ideogram and det. for mḫꜣt, "scale": see Stand (for Scales)
𓍞	U39; U+1335E				
𓍟	U40; U+1335F	a support-(to lift)		wṯs wṯs	1. to lift up, support, etc.; 2. see also: wṯs
𓍠	U41; U+13360	plummet			
𓍡	U42; U+13361	pitchfork			
	V		Rope, fibre, baskets, bags, etc.		
𓍢	V1; U+13362				"string, rope", Egyptian numeral 100
𓍣	V1A; U+13363				Egyptian numeral 200
𓍤	V1B; U+13364				Egyptian numeral 300
𓍥	V1C; U+13365				Egyptian numeral 400
𓍦	V1D; U+13366				Egyptian numeral 500
𓍧	V1E; U+13367				Egyptian numeral 600
𓍨	V1F; U+13368				Egyptian numeral 700
𓍩	V1G; U+13369				Egyptian numeral 800
𓍪	V1H; U+1336A				Egyptian numeral 900
𓍫	V1I; U+1336B				Egyptian numeral 500
𓍬	V2; U+1336C				
𓍭	V2A; U+1336D				
𓍮	V3; U+1336E				
𓍯	V4; U+1336F	lasso	wꜣ (bil.)		Lasso, for "cord", (possibly earlier, a word related to "lasso")
𓍰	V5; U+13370				
𓍱	V6; U+13371	rope-(shape)	šs (bil.)		Egyptian biliteral sign šs
𓍲	V7; U+13372	rope-(shape)	šn (bil.)		Egyptian biliteral sign šn
𓍳	V7A; U+13373				
𓍴	V7B; U+13374				
𓍵	V8; U+13375				
𓍶	V9; U+13376	shen ring		šn	Determinative in šnw, the cartouche
𓍷	V10; U+13377	cartouche	šn rn		Special uses, (often with inserted name) šn-(shen), "circle", "encircle", or a 'ring'; later time period usage for "name", rn
𓍸	V11; U+13378	cartouche-(divided)	dn		Ideas of to divide, to exclude, words related to Egyptian language tn, etc.
𓍹	V11A; U+13379				
𓍺	V11B; U+1337A				
𓍻	V11C; U+1337B				
𓐯	V11D; U+1342F				
𓍼	V12; U+1337C	Contrast V23A.			
𓍽	V12A; U+1337D				
𓍾	V12B; U+1337E				
𓍿	V13; U+1337F	tethering rope			Uniliteral ṯ (also written č)
𓎀	V14; U+13380				
𓎁	V15; U+13381	combination of tethering rope (V13) and legs walking (D54)	jṯj		to take possession of, seize, carry off, conquer, acquire
𓎂	V16; U+13382	cattle hobble (bil.)	sꜣ		bil. sꜣ; equivalent of Gardiner V17, also sꜣ, V17 (see also: tethering rope)
𓎃	V17; U+13383	lifesaver	sꜣ (bil.)		bil. sꜣ; equivalent of Gardiner V16, also sꜣ, V16 (see also: tethering rope)
𓎄	V18; U+13384				
𓎅	V19; U+13385				
𓎆	V20; U+13386	cattle hobble	mḏw (also mḏ)		Egyptian numeral 10
𓎇	V20A; U+13387				Egyptian numeral 20
𓎈	V20B; U+13388				Egyptian numeral 30
𓎉	V20C; U+13389				Egyptian numeral 40
𓎊	V20D; U+1338A				Egyptian numeral 50
𓎋	V20E; U+1338B				Egyptian numeral 60
𓎌	V20F; U+1338C				Egyptian numeral 70
𓎍	V20G; U+1338D				Egyptian numeral 80
𓎎	V20H; U+1338E				Egyptian numeral 90
𓎏	V20I; U+1338F				Egyptian numeral 20
𓎐	V20J; U+13390				Egyptian numeral 30
𓎑	V20K; U+13391				Egyptian numeral 40
𓎒	V20L; U+13392				Egyptian numeral 50
𓎓	V21; U+13393	Fetter + Cobra	mḏ, mḏwt		Deep place, deep, pit, cavern-extending, subterranean shrine, etc.
𓎔	V22; U+13394	whip	mḥ		Bil. mh, (mḥ); (See: similar shaped hieroglyph F30, water-skin)
𓎕	V23; U+13395				
𓎖	V23A; U+13396	Contrast V12.			
𓎗	V24; U+13397	"command staff" (can also be circular)			
𓎘	V25; U+13398	variant of V24 (can also be circular)	wḏ (bil.)		to give an order, to command, to decree; (bil.
𓎙	V26; U+13399				
𓎚	V27; U+1339A				
𓎛	V28; U+1339B	a twisted wick	ḥ		Uniliteral ḥ; eternity, or a long time period, (also variations of time periods, with tweaks of the seated man holding renpet-constructs); God Huh? Possibly ancestral to Proto-Sinaitic Heth and its descendants
𓎜	V28A; U+1339C				
𓎝	V29; U+1339D	(fiber) swab (straw broom)	sq, ḫsr wꜣḥ bil.-tril. bil. sq (tril. wꜣḥ		1. Biliteral sq; "to clean", "dust"; 2. Triliteral wꜣḥ
𓎞	V29A; U+1339E				
𓎟	V30; U+1339F	basket (hieroglyph)	nb (bil.)		Egyptian for "everything", every; major use: "Lord", (or feminine, Lady); Bil. nb Ideogram for basket: master, lord
𓎠	V30A; U+133A0				
𓎡	V31; U+133A1	basket- with-handle (hieroglyph)	k (unil.)		Unil. k
𓎢	V31A; U+133A2				
𓎣	V32; U+133A3				
𓎤	V33; U+133A4				
𓎥	V33A; U+133A5				
𓎦	V34; U+133A6				
𓎧	V35; U+133A7				
𓎨	V36; U+133A8	doubled container (or-added-glyphs) many spellings	ḥnty		Period of 120 years; in translation: "for..'henti years'"; from, V28 M2 N35 V36 X1 N36 ḥn-t, border, boundary, end, limit, frontier, etc.
𓎩	V37; U+133A9				
𓎪	V37A; U+133AA				
𓎫	V38; U+133AB	Compare D21, "mouth," and U28/U29, "fire-drill"			
𓎬	V39; U+133AC	?stylized ankh (for Isis)(?)	ṯt tyet		Tyet, Knot of Isis, Girdle of Isis
𓎭	V40; U+133AD				
𓎮	V40A; U+133AE				
	W		Vessels of stone and earthenware		
𓎯	W1; U+133AF	Oil jar	Ointment (mrḥt), oil		
𓎰	W2; U+133B0	Oil-jar without ties	Bas-container (bꜣs)	bꜣs	
𓎱	W3; U+133B1	alabaster basin	alabaster (šs), festival (ḥꜣb)	sš	festival (Equivalent to Gardiner W4, Jubilee Pavilion (hieroglyph)) det. in sš, 'alabaster', or "precious stone"; det. in hb abbreviation for ḥbt in "ritual book" ḥrj-ḥbt
𓎲	W3A; U+133B2	alabaster basin			
𓎳	W4; U+133B3	festival chamber, (the tail is also vertical 'Great': ꜥꜣ)	festival (ḥb)	Sṯ	Sed festival
𓎴	W5; U+133B4				Abbreviation for Lector Priest
𓎵	W6; U+133B5	metal vessel	boiler (wḥꜣt)		
𓎶	W7; U+133B6	granite bowl	red granite (mꜣṯ)	mꜣṯ	
𓎷	W8; U+133B7	deformed granite bowl	red granite (mꜣṯ)		
𓎸	W9; U+133B8	stone jug	Nechnem-oil (nẖnm)	ẖnm	
𓎹	W9A; U+133B9	stone jug (reversed)			
𓎺	W10; U+133BA	cup		wsḫ, sẖw	A. Determinative for the "vessel", Egyptian language, i'b-(no. 5 of 6); det. for i'b (1 & 2), 1: to approach, to come towards, to meet; 2: "to present a gift", to make an offering, 'an offering'; B. i', i'y, bathing; i'u, food, morning meal; i'b-(no. 3 of 6), uses Gardiner no. F16, F16 as det. for "to comb"; the other use of 'to comb', is for 'to card wool' and also uses the Horn hieroglyph, but is the equivalent word: b'-(no. 2, of 3); (no. 1 is a vessel, bowl, but made of "copper", etc.)
𓎻	W10A; U+133BB	Pot		bA (rarely)	
𓎼	W11; U+133BC	ring stand/earthenware pot		g	Uniliteral g.
𓎽	W12; U+133BD	flat ring stand		g	Old Kingdom form of W11.
𓎾	W13; U+133BE	earthenware pot			Old Kingdom form of W11.
𓎿	W14; U+133BF	water jar		m, m, gs	Bil. ḥs
𓏀	W14A; U+133C0	water jar with water			
𓏁	W15; U+133C1	water jar with water pouring out			
𓏂	W16; U+133C2	water jar with water pouring out and ring stand			
𓏃	W17; U+133C3	three water jars in rack		ḫnt	
𓏄	W17A; U+133C4	three water jars in rack (simplified)			
𓏅	W18; U+133C5	four water jars in rack		ḫnt	Old Kingdom form of W17.
𓏆	W18A; U+133C6	four water jars in rack (simplified)			
𓏇	W19; U+133C7	Milk jug with handle			1. like, as, according to, inasmuch as, since, as well as, together with; all adverbial forms, some as a segue; 2. early forms use other hieroglyphs; 3. Egyptian: mity and mitt relate to "image" or "likeness": likeness, copy, resemblance, statue, image, similitude, the like etc.
𓏈	W20; U+133C8	Milk jug with cover			
𓏉	W21; U+133C9	Wine jars			Determinative in irp, "wine"
𓏊	W22; U+133CA	Beer jug			
𓏋	W23; U+133CB	Beer jug with handles			
𓏌	W24; U+133CC	Pot		nu qd -- (bil.)-nu	Phoneme for nw; det. for qd, construct, mold; (see: ḥnk, Arm-with-nu-pot)
𓏍	W24A; U+133CD	three pots			
𓏎	W25; U+133CE	combination of pot (W24) and legs walking (D54)			
	X		Loaves and cakes		
𓏏	X1; U+133CF	loaf of bread			Uniliteral for "t"
𓏐	X2; U+133D0				
𓏑	X3; U+133D1				
𓏒	X4; U+133D2	roll of bread			
𓏓	X4A; U+133D3				
𓏔	X4B; U+133D4	alternative of X4			
𓏕	X5; U+133D5				
𓏖	X6; U+133D6	loaf with decoration			1. Determinative for the 'decorated bread loaf', pꜣt; phoneme for pꜣ; meanings of: stuff, matter, substance; for 'bread': dough, cake, bread, offering, food, product; 2. for the "primordial god(s)": "Pauti", G40 X6 X6 X6 X1 Z4 R8 R8 R8 R8 R8 R8; (many spelling versions)
𓏗	X6A; U+133D7				
𓏘	X7; U+133D8	half-loaf of bread			
𓏙	X8; U+133D9	cone- shaped bread	ḏj		Ideogram for ḏi, rḏj, give, given, to give; (an equivalent to arm offering conical "loaf"), Gardiner D37, D37; In iconography and reliefs, used for pharaonic statements: "Given, Life, Power...Forever"-(the vertical form of 'to give')
𓏚	X8A; U+133DA				
	Y		Writings, games, music		
𓏛	Y1; U+133DB	papyrus roll	papyrus scroll, book (mḏꜣt)	mḏꜣ-t mḏꜣt	Determinative for terms connected with writing, or 'abstract' concepts
𓏜	Y1A; U+133DC				(as above, but vertical)
𓏝	Y2; U+133DD	Papyrus roll-open	papyrus scroll, book (mḏꜣt)		Old Kingdom variation of Y1
𓏞	Y3; U+133DE	Scribe's equipment	to write; writing; to become finely ground	zẖꜣ; nꜥꜥ	
𓏟	Y4; U+133DF	Scribe's equipment	(as above)		Rarer alternative of Y3
𓏠	Y5; U+133E0	Senet board		mn	Extensive dictionary entries beginning at "Mn"-(or men), since the definitions center around permanence, enduring, etc. A common Pharaonic epithet was: Mn-Kheper-Ra, but many names using "mn" as a name component
𓏡	Y6; U+133E1	game piece	game figure (jbꜣ) abbreviation for dancer (jbꜣ)	jbꜣ	1. Ideogram or det. in ibꜣ, "pawn", draughtsman; phoneme for ibꜣ; 2. Det. for ibꜣu, ibꜣ, dance [of the gods]; also dancer, dancing man, etc.
𓏢	Y7; U+133E2	harp	harp	bjnt	Determinative in bjnt, "arched harp"; (see article Medamud for relief usage)
𓏣	Y8; U+133E3	Sistrum	Sistrum (sššt)	sš, sššt (also sḫm)	A. Ideo. for "sistrum", sššt, (or sḫm "sistrum"); det. in sššt; B. sḫm is Egyptian for 'power', (confer with Sekhem scepter-(list sḫm) and Medamud-(article))
	Z		Strokes, signs derived from Hieratic, geometrical features		
𓏤	Z1; U+133E4	Single stroke	singularity, Egyptian numeral 1		Indicates that the prior sign is an Ideogram as if it had no feminine ending; can stand as an abundance stroke at empty places
𓏥	Z2; U+133E5	Plural stroke (horizontal)			Plural, majority, collective concept (e.g. meat, jwf)
𓏦	Z2A; U+133E6				Can be used as a replacement for signs perceived to be dangerous to actually write
𓏧	Z2B; U+133E7				
𓏨	Z2C; U+133E8				
𓏩	Z2D; U+133E9				
𓏪	Z3; U+133EA	plural strokes (vertical)			Can be used as a replacement for signs perceived to be dangerous to actually write
𓏫	Z3A; U+133EB				
𓏬	Z3B; U+133EC				
𓏭	Z4; U+133ED	Dual stroke	Egyptian numeral 2, plural, majority, collective concept (e.g. meat, jwf), duality	for j (y) (only if ending sounds like a dual ending)	Can be used as a replacement for signs perceived to be dangerous to actually write
𓏮	Z4A; U+133EE				Egyptian numeral 2
𓏯	Z5; U+133EF	Diagonal stroke (from hieratic)			Can be used as a replacement for signs perceived to be dangerous to actually write
𓏰	Z5A; U+133F0				
𓏱	Z6; U+133F1	Substitute for various human figures	for death, die (mwt)		
𓏲	Z7; U+133F2	coil (hieratic equivalent)		w (or u)	unil., equivalent of unil. w, the quail chick, G43; Both chick and coil are used for plural, the w, (or u) (see also: Plural)
𓏳	Z8; U+133F3	Oval	round (šnw)		
𓏴	Z9; U+133F4	Crossed diagonal sticks	destroy (ḥḏj), break, divide (wpj), over load (ḏꜣj), cross, meet	swꜣ, sḏ, ḫbs, šbn, wp, wr	Possibly ancestral to Proto-Sinaitic Taw and its descendants
𓏵	Z10; U+133F5	Crossed diagonal sticks	destroy (ḥḏj), break, divide (wpj), over load (ḏꜣj), cross, meet	swꜣ, sḏ, ḫbs, šbn, wp, wr	Determinative for "break, divide" (wpj), "over load" (ḏꜣj), "cross, meet"
𓏶	Z11; U+133F6	two planks crossed and joined		imi	
𓏷	Z12; U+133F7				
𓏸	Z13; U+133F8				
𓏹	Z14; U+133F9				
𓏺	Z15; U+133FA				Egyptian numeral 1
𓏻	Z15A; U+133FB				Egyptian numeral 2
𓏼	Z15B; U+133FC				Egyptian numeral 3
𓏽	Z15C; U+133FD				Egyptian numeral 4
𓏾	Z15D; U+133FE				Egyptian numeral 5
𓏿	Z15E; U+133FF				Egyptian numeral 6
𓐀	Z15F; U+13400				Egyptian numeral 7
𓐁	Z15G; U+13401				Egyptian numeral 8
𓐂	Z15H; U+13402				Egyptian numeral 9
𓐃	Z15I; U+13403				Egyptian numeral 5
𓐄	Z16; U+13404				Numeral 1 in dates
𓐅	Z16A; U+13405				Numeral 2 in dates
𓐆	Z16B; U+13406				Numeral 3 in dates
𓐇	Z16C; U+13407				Numeral 4 in dates
𓐈	Z16D; U+13408				Numeral 5 in dates
𓐉	Z16E; U+13409				Numeral 6 in dates
𓐊	Z16F; U+1340A				Numeral 7 in dates
𓐋	Z16G; U+1340B				Numeral 8 in dates
𓐌	Z16H; U+1340C				Numeral 9 in dates
	Aa		Unclassified signs		
𓐍	Aa1; U+1340D	Placenta or sieve		ḫ	Uniliteral ḫ.
𓐎	Aa2; U+1340E	Pustule	bodily growths or conditions, disease		
𓐏	Aa3; U+1340F	Pustule with liquid issuing from it	medical or anatomical condition, specifically soft matter or liquid		Rare alternative for AA2
𓐐	Aa4; U+13410			bꜣ (rarely)	See § W10
𓐑	Aa5; U+13411	Part of steering gear of a ship	hasten (ḥjp), hepet-device (ḥpt)	ḥp (rarely)	
𓐒	Aa6; U+13412		mat (ṯmꜣ)	tmꜣ, ṯmꜣ	
𓐓	Aa7; U+13413	A Smiting-Blade	spr		Abbreviation for "smite" (spr)
𓐔	Aa7A; U+13414				
𓐕	Aa7B; U+13415				
𓐖	Aa8; U+13416	Irrigation tunnels	estate (ḏꜣtt)	qn, ḏꜣt, ḏꜣḏꜣt	
𓐗	Aa9; U+13417		rich (ḫwd)		
𓐘	Aa10; U+13418		drf		
𓐙	Aa11; U+13419		Raised platform (ṯntt), platform abbreviation for mꜣꜥ in (mꜣꜥ-ḫrw)	mꜣꜥ and mꜣꜥ in mꜣꜥ-ḫrw	
𓐚	Aa12; U+1341A		Raised platform (ṯntt), platform abbreviation for mꜣꜥ in (mꜣꜥ-ḫrw)	mꜣꜥ	
𓐛	Aa13; U+1341B		side area (jmw), side (gs)	m, m, gs	
𓐜	Aa14; U+1341C		side area (jmw), side (gs)	m, m, gs	
𓐝	Aa15; U+1341D			jm, m, gs	
𓐞	Aa16; U+1341E		side (gs)	gs	
𓐟	Aa17; U+1341F		back (sꜣ)	sꜣ	
𓐠	Aa18; U+13420		back (sꜣ)	sꜣ	
𓐡	Aa19; U+13421			ḥr	
𓐢	Aa20; U+13422			ꜥpr	
𓐣	Aa21; U+13423		divide (wḏꜥ)		Abbreviation for Seth
𓐤	Aa22; U+13424		divide (wḏꜥ)		Abbreviation for Seth
𓐥	Aa23; U+13425				Often instead of U35
𓐦	Aa24; U+13426				Often instead of U35
𓐧	Aa25; U+13427		garment priest (smꜣ)		
𓐨	Aa26; U+13428			sbj	
𓐩	Aa27; U+13429			nḏ	
𓐪	Aa28; U+1342A			qd	
𓐫	Aa29; U+1342B				
𓐬	Aa30; U+1342C		Kheker-frieze		
𓐭	Aa31; U+1342D				
𓐮	Aa32; U+1342E				

== See also ==
- Egyptian hieroglyphs
- Transliteration of Ancient Egyptian
- Egyptian Hieroglyph Format Controls (Unicode block)
- List of cuneiform signs
