= Swallow (hieroglyph) =

Egyptian hieroglyph

G36
Swallow
in hieroglyphs

Gardiner: G36

The Ancient Egyptian Swallow hieroglyph is Gardiner sign listed no. G36 for swallow birds. The Sparrow hieroglyph appears similar in size and shape, but it is used to represent small, or bad items.

The swallow hieroglyph is used in Egyptian hieroglyphs as a phonogram or biliteral for wr-(or ur), and means items that are "great". It might be considered an equivalent to the cuneiform: gal, GAL, also meaning 'great'. The swallow hieroglyph is also an ideogram for the swallow birds.

== See also ==
- Gardiner's Sign List#G. Birds
- List of Egyptian hieroglyphs § G
