= Leopard head (hieroglyph) =

Egyptian hieroglyph

F9
Leopard
Head
in hieroglyphs

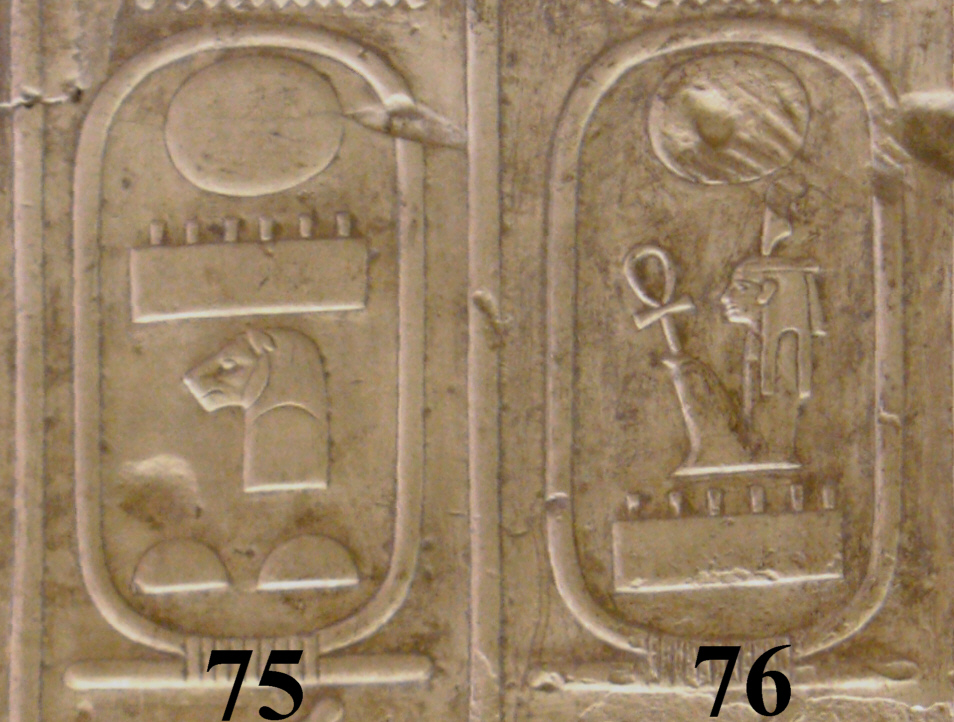
Example hieroglyph, Egyptian King list cartouche.

The ancient Egyptian Leopard head hieroglyph, Gardiner sign listed as Gardiner sign F9, depicts the head of a leopard; it is in the Gardiner subset for "parts of mammals".

In the Egyptian language, the Leopard head hieroglyph is used as a determinative or abbreviation for words relating to 'strength'. In the language it is used for pehti-(pḥty).

== See also ==
- Gardiner's Sign List#F. Parts of Mammals
- List of Egyptian hieroglyphs
