= Bowstring (hieroglyph) =

Egyptian hieroglyph

T12
Bowstring
in hieroglyphs

The ancient Egyptian Bowstring hieroglyph is an Egyptian language hieroglyph associated with the bow, and its use as a hieroglyph for the Archer hieroglyph, a symbol for 'army'. Because of the strength required to "string a bow", with a bow string, the bowstring hieroglyph is used to define words of strength, hardness, durability, etc.

The hieroglyphic language equivalent of the bowstring is "rwdj", and means "hard, strong, durable".

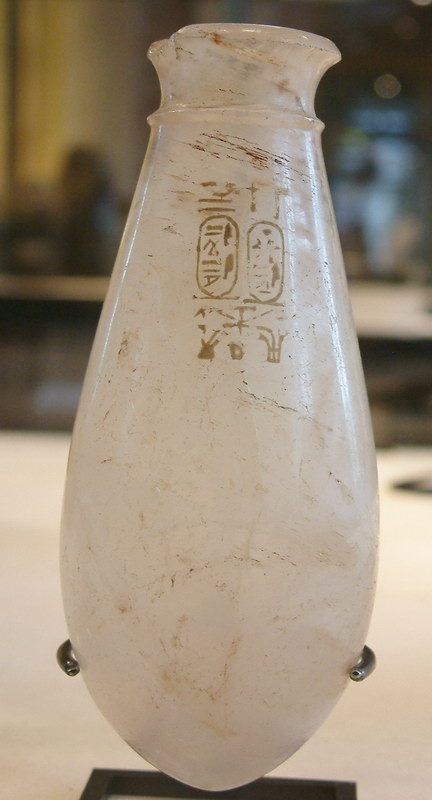
23rd Dynasty rock crystal vase of Pharaoh Rudamun.

Pharaoh Rudamun of the 23rd Dynasty, 757-54 BC has his name in two cartouches showing the use of the bowstring hieroglyph, (only one uses the bowstring). A white rock crystal vase has two cartouches above the hieroglyphic symbol for union symbol (hieroglyph). One cartouche uses the bowstring hieroglyph and states his name: "A-mn-Rudj–A-mn-Mer", and is approximately: "Amun's Strength—Amun's Beloved".

== See also ==
- List of Egyptian hieroglyphs
