= Face (hieroglyph) =

Egyptian hieroglyph

D2
Face
in hieroglyphs

The ancient Egyptian Face hieroglyph, Gardiner sign listed no. D2 is a portrayal of the human face, frontal view.

It is an Egyptian language biliteral with the value hr, ḥr. The sign is also an ideogram for 'face', and related words.

== Preposition usage ==
D2 Z1 F34 Z1
"in the
middle of"
in hieroglyphs

The Face hieroglyph is used as a preposition, and in preposition constructs. The common meanings for the single face are: in, at, upon, on, by, etc.

== See also ==
- Gardiner's Sign List#D. Parts of the Human Body
- List of Egyptian hieroglyphs
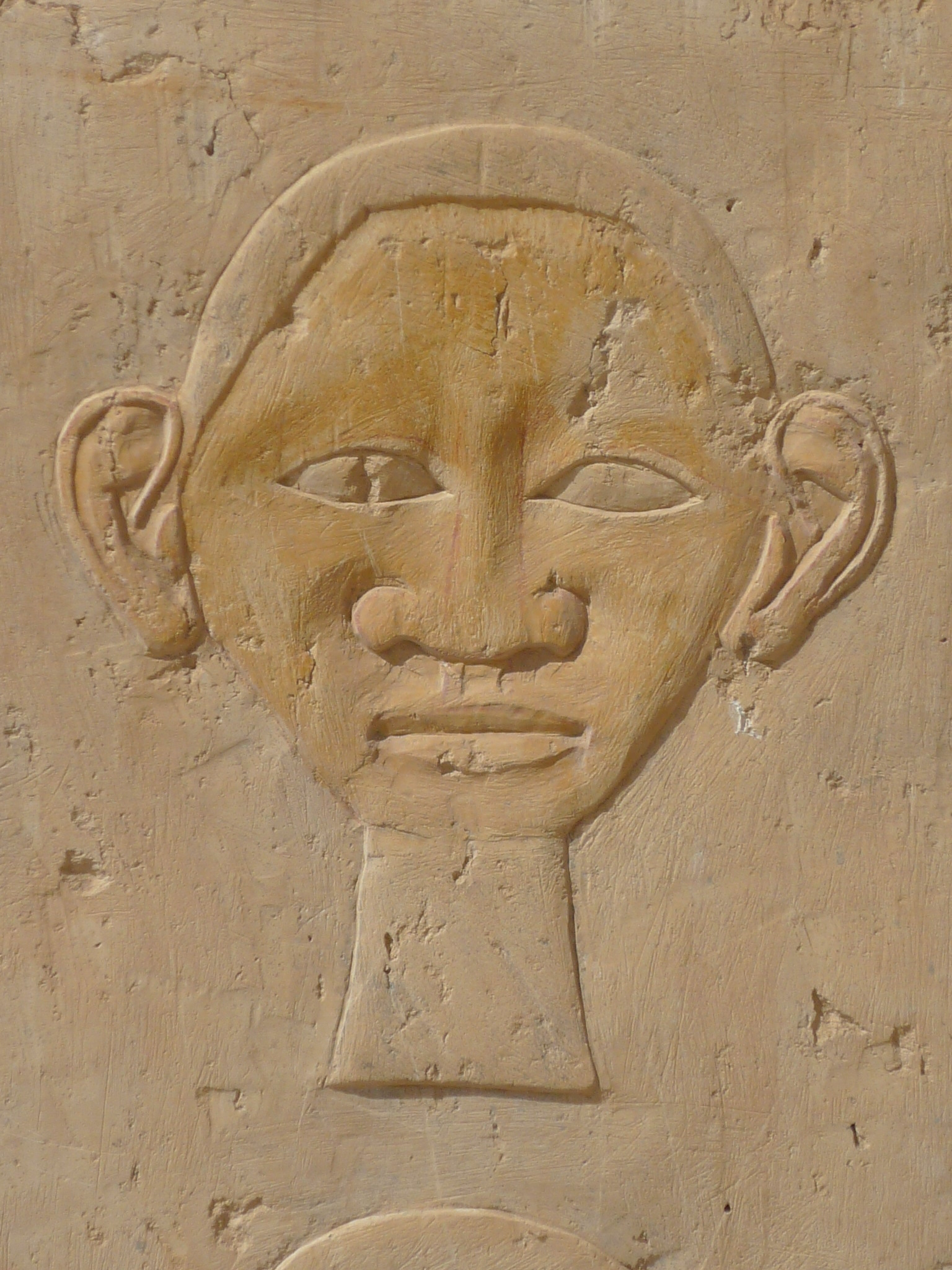
Face hieroglyph (detailed closeup view)

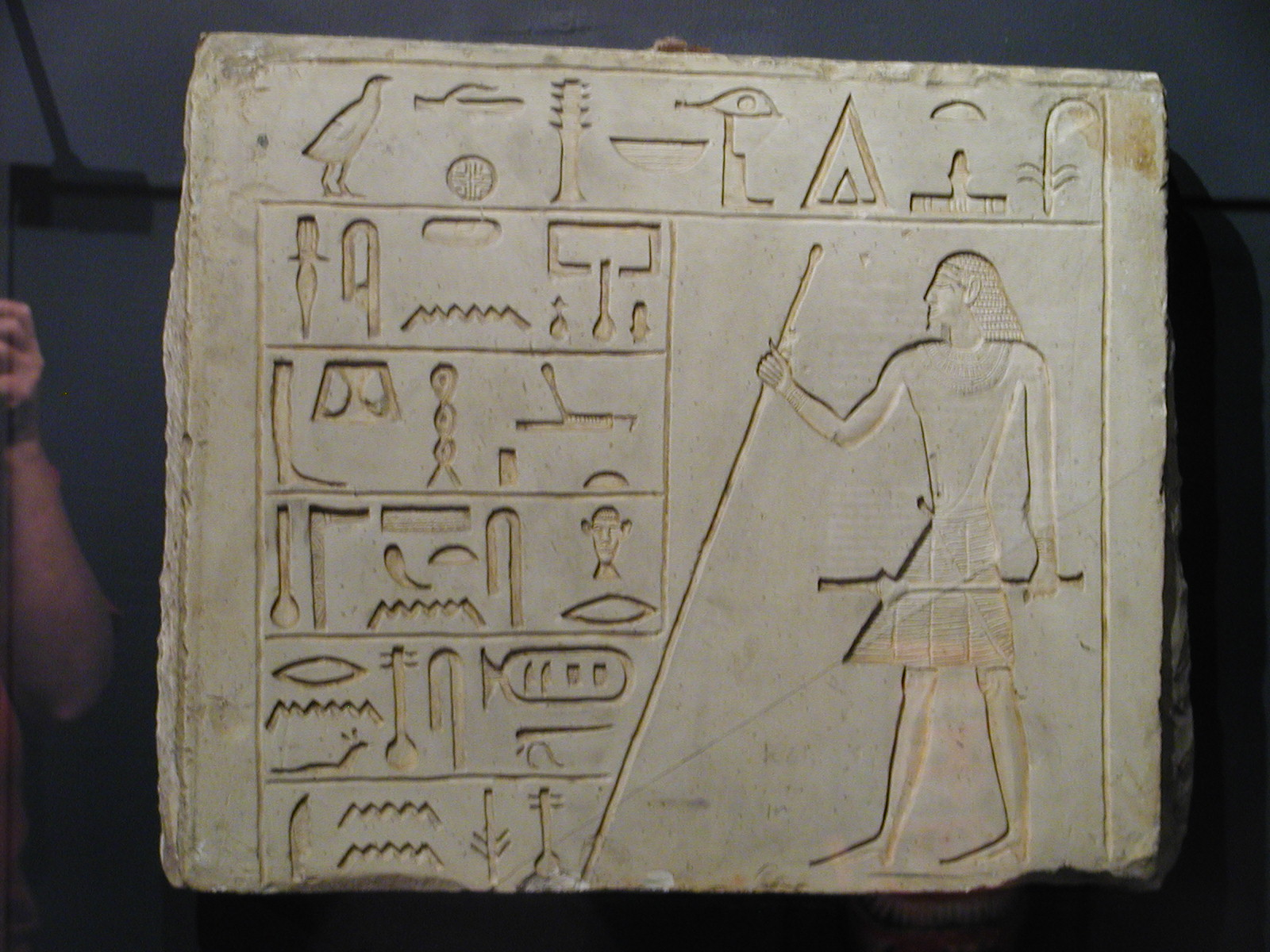
relief
