= Pustule (hieroglyph) =

Aa2
spelled ‘wḥꜣ’, ‘wt’, ‘ḥsb’
Pustule? Gland?
in hieroglyphs

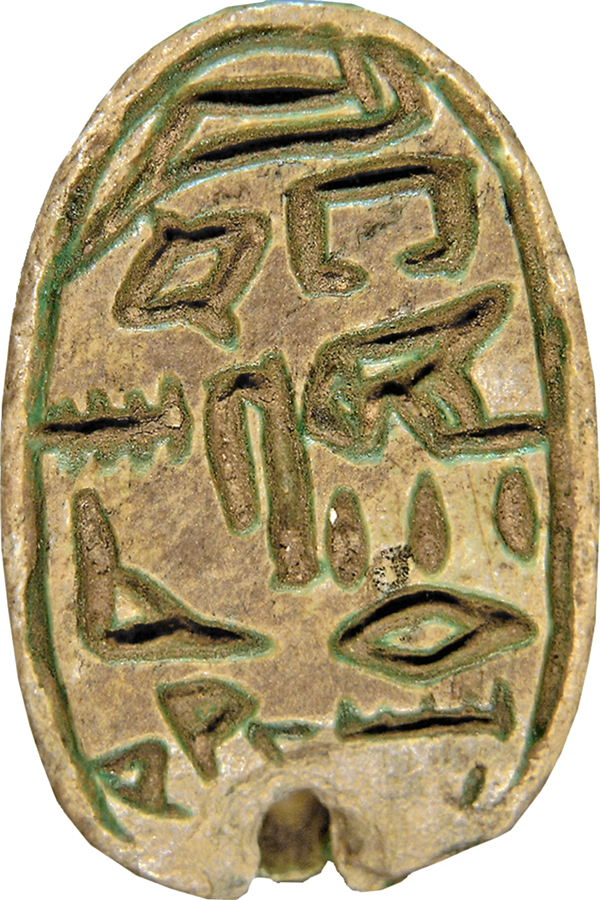
Private Name Seal of Reni-seneb

The Pustule hieroglyph is a symbol in Gardiner's sign list as no. Aa2, in the unclassified category. Its identity is given to be of a pustule or a gland, though some Egyptologists interpret the symbol to be of "the embalmer’s two fingers bringing together the sides of the wound done for eviscerating (removing the internal organs) of the body", connecting the symbol with the late attesting two fingers amulets which are used to invoke the magical healing of the wound by Anubis. The "pustule" symbol both as a phonogram and an ideogram has the values of wḥꜣ "oasis", wt "to bind, bandage", wḫdw "pain, purulency, inflammation", ḥsb "to add, count, calculate".

== See also ==
- Gardiner's Sign List § Aa. Unclassified
- List of Egyptian hieroglyphs § Aa2

== Bibliography ==
- Allen, James. P. Middle Egyptian: An Introduction to the Language and Culture of Hieroglyphs. Cambridge University Press, New York, 2010. ISBN 978-0-521-51796-6 Hardcover.
