= Brazier (hieroglyph) =

Egyptian hieroglyph

Q7
Brazier
in hieroglyphs

The ancient Egyptian Brazier hieroglyph is Gardiner sign listed no. Q7 for the cooking brazier. It is shown from the Old Kingdom in the style of a vertical burning flame upon four feet, but the hieroglyph has the flame hiding the fourth foot. Another Gardiner unlisted form has the four feet, with no flame, and in a plan view.

The brazier hieroglyph is used in Egyptian hieroglyphs as a determinative for the 'brazier', or 'flame', or words related to 'cooking with a brazier', or a substitute. The brazier also has the Egyptian language value of 'kh-('ḫ).

== See also ==
- List of hieroglyphs/Q, "Domestics and Funerary Furniture" from Gardiner's sign list
- Brazier
- Lake of Fire
