= Stair-single (hieroglyph) =

Egyptian hieroglyph

O40
Stair-(Single)
in hieroglyphs

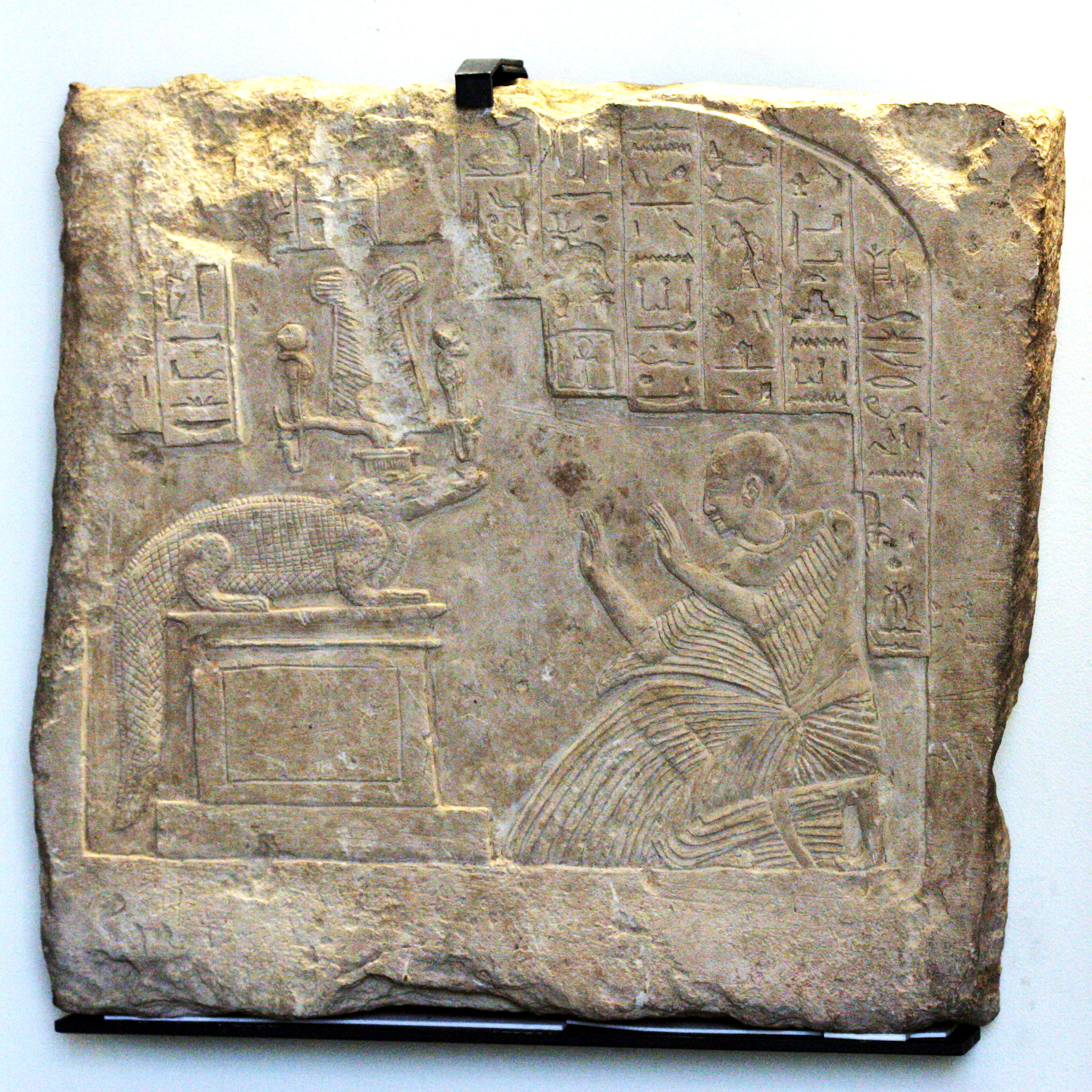
Relief with offerings to Sobek, showing Stair-Double; (See in Budge, Rdu, the Stairs of Sobek). (The offering relief is by Scribe Aa-mer-R-u(coil)-t, (Aa-mer-r-u-t); a meteor (hieroglyph) unlisted replaces the incense-pot.)

The ancient Egyptian Single-Stair hieroglyph, Gardiner sign listed no. O40 is a single staircase in the Gardiner subset for "buildings, parts of buildings, etc." A second full double-staircase is no. O41, O41

In the Egyptian language, the single stair hieroglyph is used as a determinative.

Preceded by D56 leg rd	O40 single- stair (determinative) rd="stairs" "staircase"	Succeeded by X8 bread-cone (di) rdi

== See also ==
- Gardiner's Sign List#O. Buildings, Parts of Buildings, etc.
- List of Egyptian hieroglyphs
