= Phonogram (linguistics) =

Grapheme

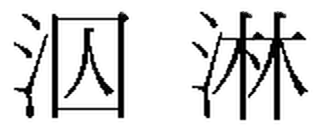
Chinese Phonogram examples

A phonogram or phonograph (from Ancient Greek phōnḗ 'sound' + grắphō 'writing') is a basic unit of writing (or grapheme) that represents a sound used when speaking a particular language, like a phoneme or syllable. For example, in the English word high, ⟨igh⟩ is a grapheme representing the phoneme /aɪ/—while ⟨igh⟩ is written using three letters potentially treated as distinct in other contexts, they cannot be analyzed separately in this case, as the intended sound is only indicated when read as a single unit. While the word phoneme refers to the sound itself, phonogram instead refers to the written representation of the sound.

A writing system that consists of phonograms shows phonography, and can be called phonographic. Phonograms are contrasted with logograms, graphemes that represent units of meaning like words, morphemes, and determinatives (silent characters used to mark semantic categories).
