= Sail (hieroglyph) =

Egyptian hieroglyph

P5
Sail
in hieroglyphs

The ancient Egyptian Sail hieroglyph is Gardiner sign listed no. P5 for the sail of a ship. The hieroglyph shows a hoisted sail, curved because of wind filling it. It is used in Egyptian hieroglyphs as a determinative for words related to wind, air, breath, sailors, (as "nefu"), floods-(of the Nile), etc. Also an ideogram in 'puff', 'wind', Egyptian ṯꜣw.

== Breath, in the Book of the Dead ==
Because of the use of the word 'winds', the 'breath' concept became an equally important usage of the sail hieroglyph. The Nile current carried ships downstream-(north), but sometimes prevailing, or advantageous winds allowed upstream travel on the Nile.

A replacement of the sekhem scepter held in the hand in vignettes from the Books of the Dead refers to obtaining life-giving 'breath' in the afterlife. An example is Nakht, (Papyrus of Nakht, 18th-19th Dynasty), holding a large mast-on-a-staff, referring to Spell 38A, for living by air in the realm of the dead. Other stick figured caricature examples show the mast and an ankh in each hand, both signifying a "breath (of) life".

Other spells in the Book of the Dead use the concept of 'breath' in even more storied forms and involving various gods.

Preceded by V30 basket-(bil.) nb	P5 sail (tsh)3w/ṯau, (nef)	Succeeded by F35 "stomach + windpipe" nfr - (tril.)
Succeeded by F35.T34 "windpipe" -- butcher's knife --- nfr ----- ----- nm ---

== See also ==
- Gardiner's Sign List#P. Ships and Parts of Ships
- List of Egyptian hieroglyphs
