= Papyrus stem (hieroglyph) =

Egyptian hieroglyph

M13
Papyrus
stem
in hieroglyphs

The ancient Egyptian Papyrus stem hieroglyph is one of the oldest language hieroglyphs from Ancient Egypt. The papyrus stalk, (or stem) was incorporated into designs of columns on buildings, also facades, and is also in the iconographic art portrayed in ancient Egyptian decorated scenes.

The papyrus stem hieroglyph shows a single stalk and umbel of the plant. It is used to represent the color green, and for vigour, or youth (growing things).

== Usage ==
G43 G1 I10
w3dj
component letters-'U-A-dj'
in hieroglyphs

M13 M14 M40 V4 I10 M13
3 of
many spellings, 'W3dj'
in hieroglyphs

M13 G36 N38 M13 G36 D21 M17 N35 N35 N35 N36
Uatch-ur
the Great Green Sea
the Mediterranean
in hieroglyphs

The basic usage of the papyrus stem hieroglyph is as an ideogram, (graphic picture), in the word for 'papyrus stem', w3dj, or the older representation uatch.

As the papyrus plant is from the Nile Delta, and is a symbol of Lower Egypt and its green and productive quality of food growing, the papyrus stem is also used to represent 'growth', 'vigour', 'youth', all things fresh, new and growing.

The green color, or the Nile Delta's connection to the Mediterranean Sea, gave rise to the term Great Green, meaning the Mediterranean, and thus the hieroglyphic spelling of the sea uses the papyrus stem (green, great, or green-great-sea: w3dj-wr).

Other words in the family of w3dj, or uatch, are: green, yellow green, green stones, eyepaint; also trees, plants, and amulets.

=== Rosetta Stone examples ===
The papyrus stem occurs in three places on the Rosetta Stone. The first half of the stone is represented by the Nubayrah Stele, lines N-1 to N-27, (the Rosetta Stone starts at line N-22, and is from R-1 to R-14). Line N-19 of the Nubayrah Stele refers to the Great Green, the Mediterranean Sea, and uses the papyrus with the cobra (Gardiner No. M14).

The opening of the Decree of Memphis, the Rosetta Stone begins by addressing Ptolemy V Epiphanes and uses the papyrus stem in two lines, N-1 and N-2, and addresses the gods and the pharaoh as follows:

... like a king upon the throne of his father, (the Two Ladies) lord of the Vulture Crown [Upper Egypt], lord of the Uraeus Crown [Lower Egypt], mighty one of strength, establisher of the Two Lands [Egypt], [papyrus stem for the delta-north], benefactor of Ta-Mer, [i.e. Egypt], benevolent of heart towards the gods, the Horus, making vigorous the life of men and women [second usage of papyrus stem], lord of the Sed festivals ...

== Papyrus stem amulet ==
Besides the personal use of the amulet in life, the body was often provided with amulets in burial, with more amulets implying more protection. The most common funerary amulets were the heart scarab, Wadjet Eye, Djed Pillar amulet, Wadj amulet, Tyet amulet, and the golden vulture collar (for the goddess Mut). Amulet usage changed greatly over the millenniums of Ancient Egypt.

The papyrus stem, or Wadj amulet was made from green feldspar as prescribed in Chapter 160, Charpter 159 from the Book of the Dead. The most common explanation for the amulet is that it was believed to provide eternal youth to the deceased.

== 14 Spirits of Ra ==
F22 R12 N8 D40 S40 M13 G38 A50 D3 M44 R11 D4 D18 S32 F18
14 kaU of Ra, "Spirits of Ra"
in hieroglyphs

The papyrus stem is one of the 14 Spirits of Ra:

- "Word of Power"
- Light
- Strength, see for similar use: Djsr
- Power, represented by the was-sceptre
- Vigour, represented by the papyrus stem, papyrus
- Abundance
- Majesty, see Hatshepsut (the hieroglyph as a component of her name)
- Burial
- Preparedness
- Stability, see Djed
- Sight, see the Eye of Horus
- Hearing
- Feeling, perception, see the Rosetta Stone, line 13, before the trilingual inscription, so that "... each month, and each year, will know ('be cognizant'; Greek: gnostic, 'gnorimon'), all the dwellers in Egypt," construct and erect a stone stele in each of the scripts. See also Sia, the deification of wisdom
- Taste

Hieroglyph 13 for feeling, perception is not part of Gardiner's sign list; the sign is similar to an upside-down pennant, or flag, positioned above the head of a seated man. A minor Egyptian god, Sia, can be found at the front of the Solar Barque with other gods, leading the barque, as Sia was believed to see, or know the path forward. Sia is pictured with the knowing gnostic sign on top of her head.

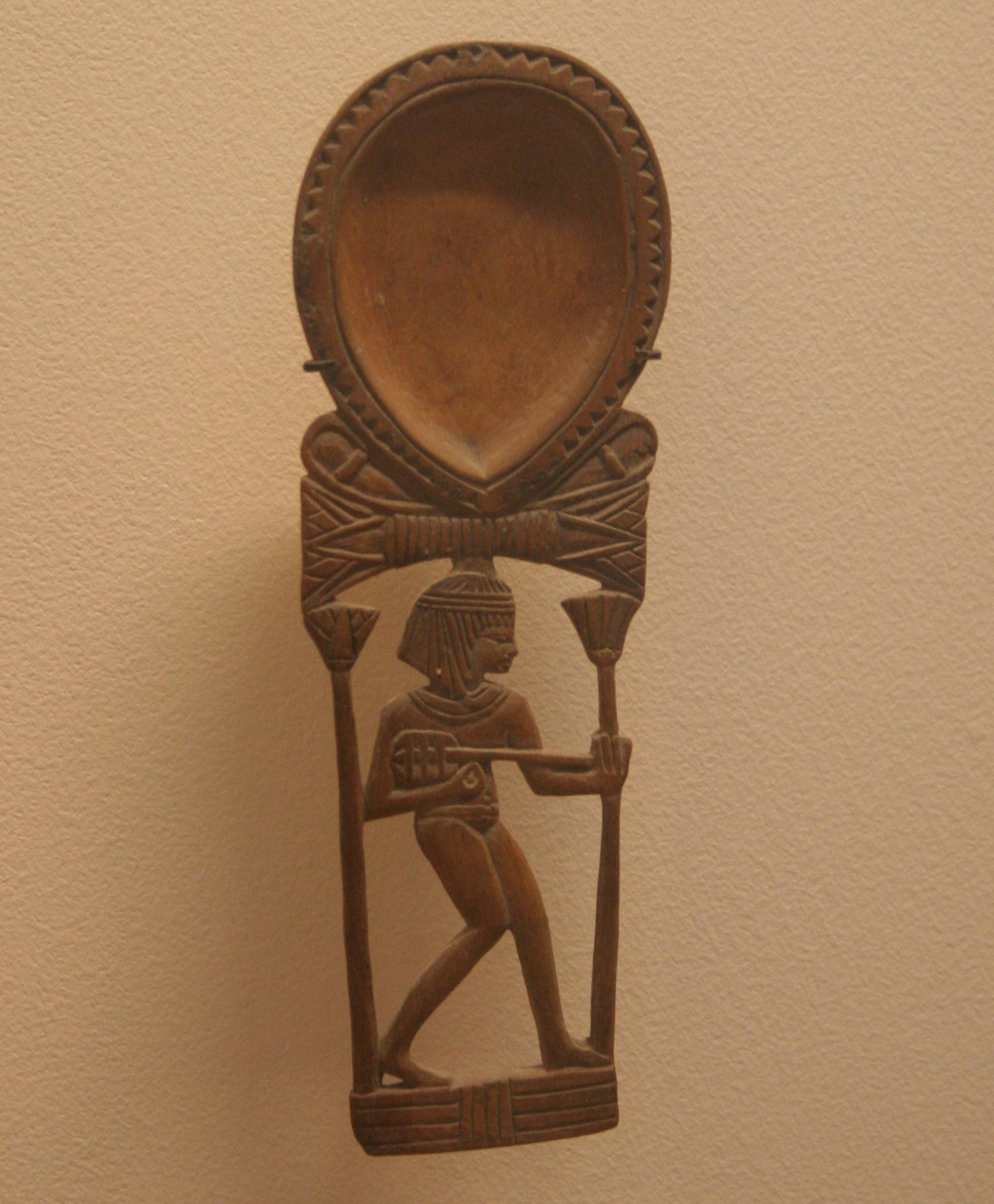
Cosmetic spoon using the papyrus stalk

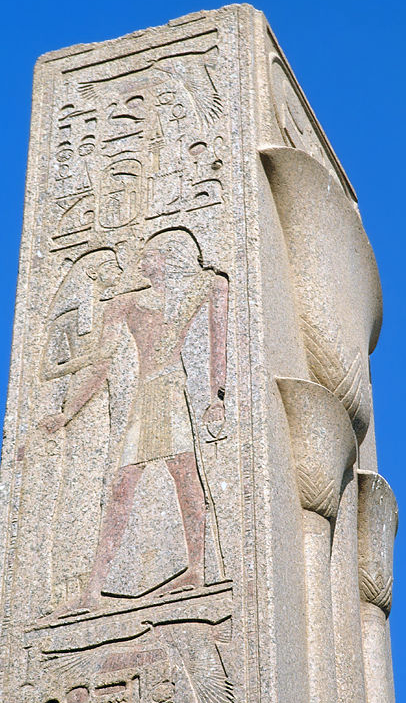
Pillar for Thutmosis III

== Iconography ==
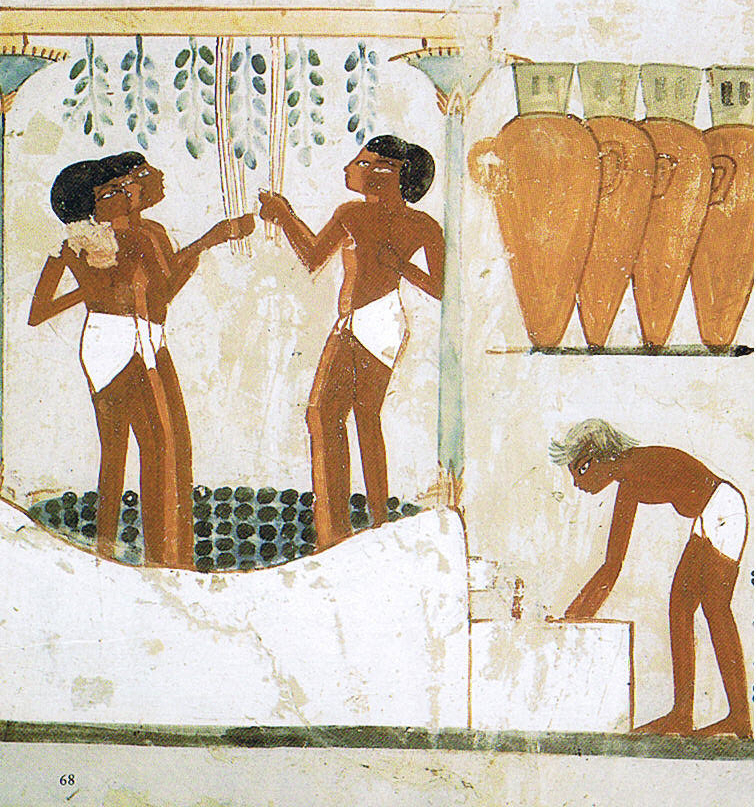
Grapevine arbor supported iconographically by the papyrus stem

Examples of iconographic use of the papyrus stem range from wall scenes, tombs, and architectural components, including complete columns, to amulets. Besides building columns as papyrus stems, the pillars that support the sky, the four corners of the earth, were also sometimes represented by the papyrus stem, (Gardiner No. O-40).

| Preceded by N31 road-with-shrubs --- w3t | M13; Papyrus stem-(tril.) --- w3dj-(uatch-uadj) | Succeeded by T21 harpoon-(bil.) --- u' |

== Gallery ==
Many artifacts of Ancient Egypt, as well as architecture elements used the papyrus stem motif. Some specific examples are kohl spoons, or the papyrus handled mirror.

=== Papyrus-handled mirror ===
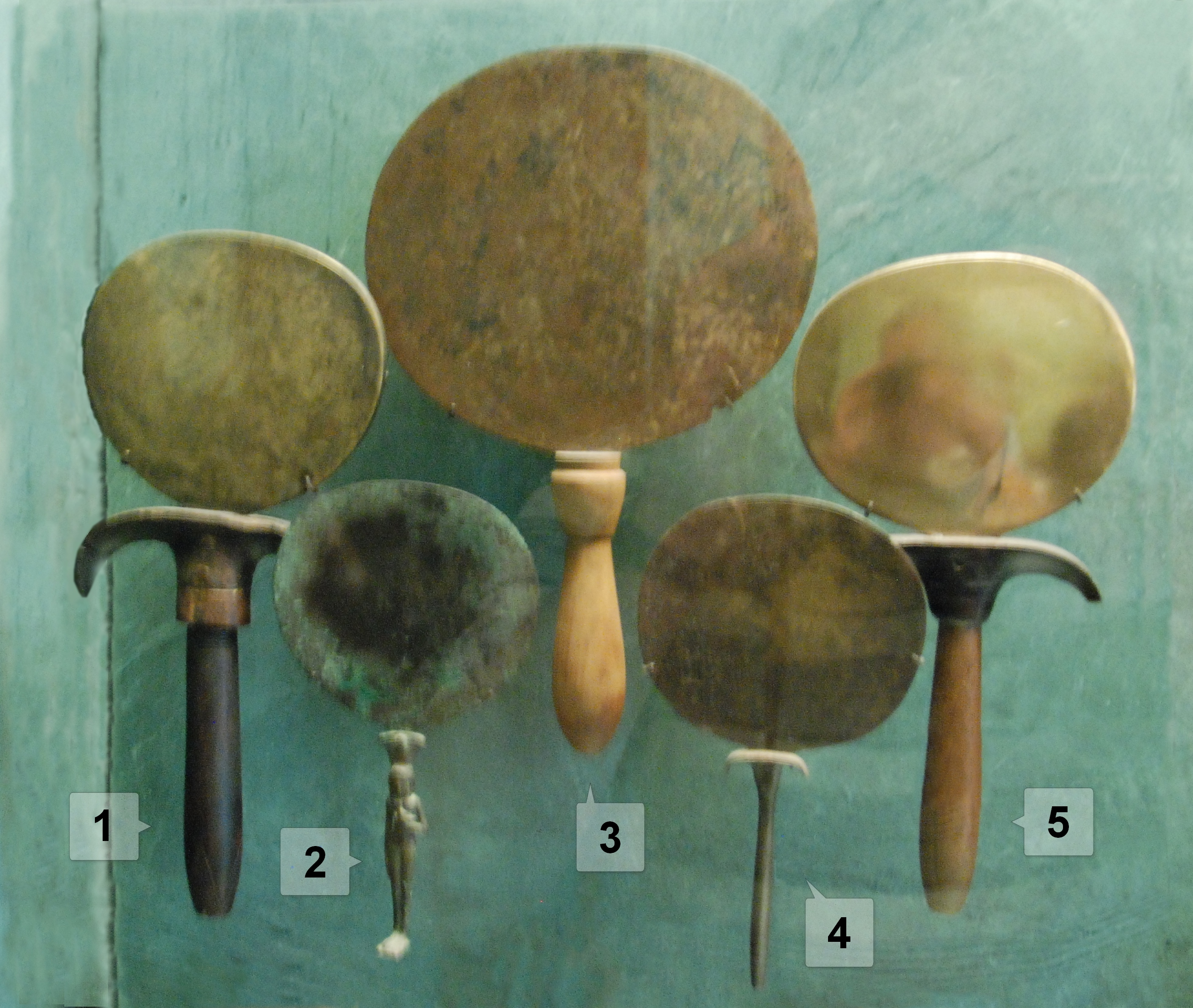
mirror group

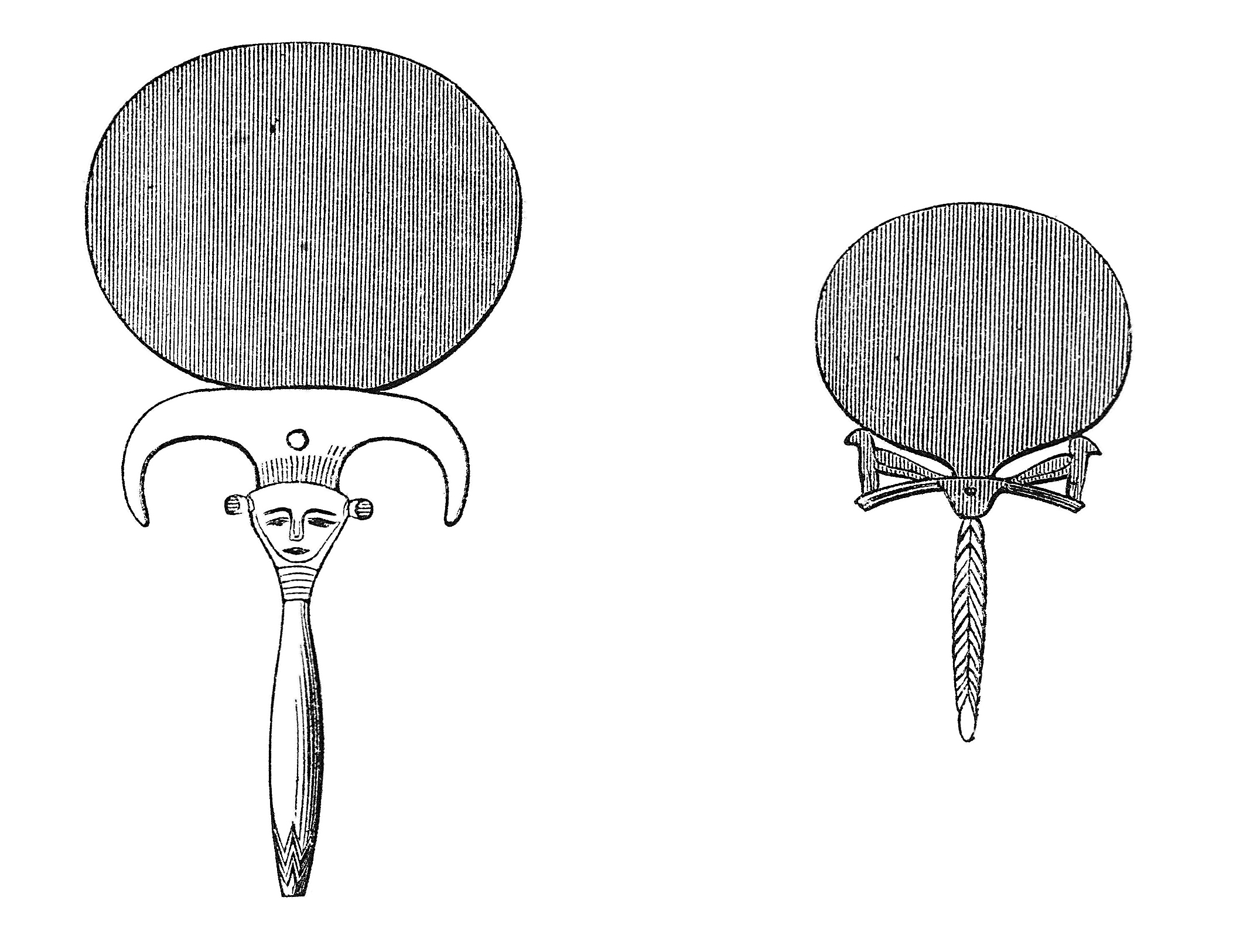
1 – Papyrus-handled, and 2 – Ankh-handled mirror

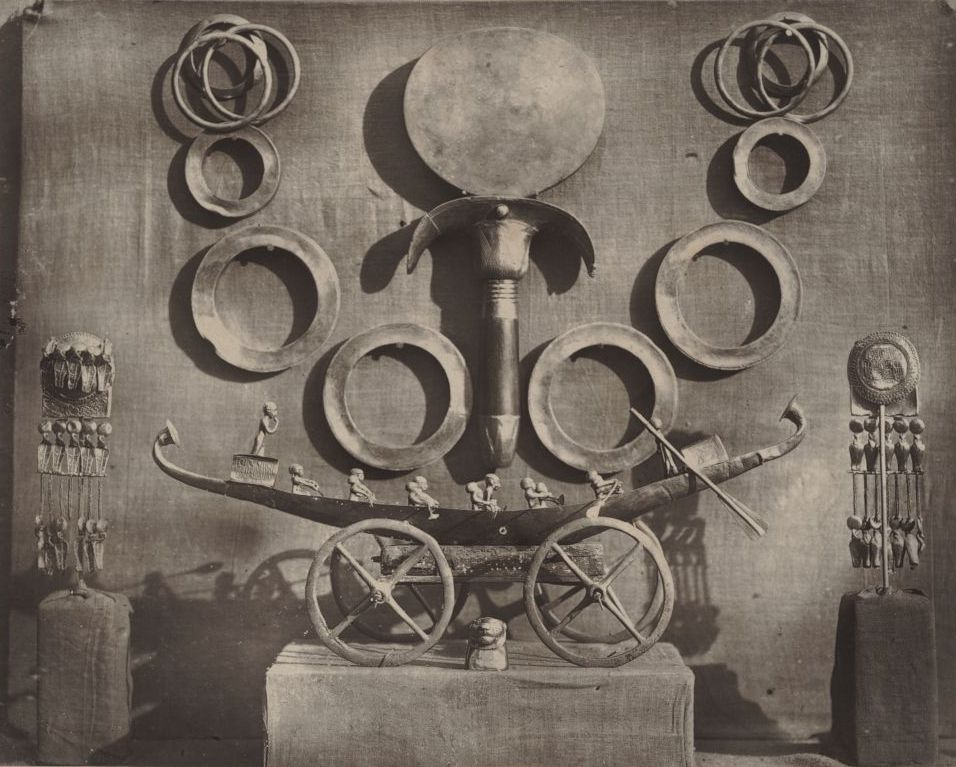
mirror among other artefacts

== See also ==
- Gardiner's Sign List#M. Trees and Plants
- List of Egyptian hieroglyphs
- Wadjet
- Wadj-wer
