= Road (hieroglyph) =

Egyptian hieroglyph

N31
Road-
-with-shrubs
in hieroglyphs

The Ancient Egyptian Road-with-shrubs hieroglyph is Gardiner sign listed no. N31 for a road, "street", or pathway. It originally was a curving hieroglyph, but became a standardized straight form as well.

The Road hieroglyph is used in Egyptian hieroglyphs as an ideogram or determinative in the word w3t-(uat), for 'road'. It is also a phonogram for hr, from the word hrt, also for 'road'.

Preceded by S40; Was scepter-(tril.) - w3s	N31 road-with-shrubs w3t-(uAt)	Succeeded by M13; Papyrus stem-(tril.) w3dj-(uatch-uadj)
Succeeded by M13,T21 papyrus stem-(tril.)--harpoon-(bil.) --- w3dj ---- ---- u' ---

== See also ==
- Gardiner's Sign List#N. Sky, Earth, Water
- List of Egyptian hieroglyphs
