= Egyptian sceptre =

Egyptian sceptre can refer to:

- Was (sceptre), a hieroglyph symbol and sceptre associated with Egyptian gods and pharaohs
- Sekhem scepter, a ritual sceptre associated with power, authority, and the god Osiris
- Certain Egyptian administrative divisions called nomes were named for sceptres
  - Heq-At (Prospering Spectre), centred around Heliopolis/modern-day Cairo in Lower Egypt
  - Waset (nome) (Sceptre), centred around Thebes/modern-day Karnak in Upper Egypt
  - Uab (nome) (Two Sceptres), centred around Oxyrhynchus/modern-day El-Bahnasa in Upper Egypt
