= Egyptian triliteral signs =

Hieroglyphs representing three consonants

As part of the system of Egyptian hieroglyphs, some hieroglyphs served as phonograms representing one, two, or three consonants, used purely for their consonantal values. This use as phonograms contrasts with use as logograms, where hieroglyphs represent an entire word depicted by the image of the hieroglyph itself that may also have the same one, two, or three consonants.

== List ==
The following is a list of hieroglyphs used as phonographs with triconsonantal phonetic values. These forms and their values are from Allen (2014), unless otherwise indicated.^{[A]}

	Gardiner	Unicode	Unicode	Transl.	Description	Notes
E26	E26	U+130F0	𓃰	ꜣbw		
W10	W10	U+133BA	𓎺	iꜥb, wsḫ, ḥnt, ḥnw	Bowl	Allen (2014) has the transliteration ḥnw, others are from Beylage (2018)
O28	O28	U+1327A	𓉺	iwn	Column with tendon	
M1	M1	U+131AD	𓆭	imꜣ	Tree	
F44	F44	U+1312F	𓄯	isw, iwꜥ	Bone with meat	iwꜥ "meat on the bone, haunch"; iwꜥ.w "heir", iwꜥ.t "inheritance"; isw "reward, payment"
V37	V37	U+133A9	𓎩	idr	Bandage	Triliteral in Beylage (2018).
F21	F21	U+13114	𓄔	idn, sḏm	Ear	
S39	S39	U+132FF	𓋿	ꜥwt	Shepherd's crook	ꜥw.t "flock"
D34	D34	U+1309A	𓂚	ꜥḥꜣ	Arms with shield and mace	Triliteral in Beylage (2018).
V12	V12	U+1337C	𓍼	ꜥrq	Band of string	Triliteral in Beylage (2018). ꜥrq "wise"; ꜥrq "swear an oath"; ꜥrq.y "last day of the month"; sꜥrq "complete, finish off"
S42	S42	U+1327A	𓌂	ꜥbꜣ, sḫm	ꜥbꜣ-scepter	
Aa20	Aa20	U+13422	𓐢	ꜥpr	Bag for clothing	ꜥpr "provide, equip", ꜥpr.w "equipment"; ꜥpr.w "jewelry"; ꜥpr.w "crew of a ship"
S34	S34	U+132F9	𓋹	ꜥnḫ	Ankh symbol	Ideogram for "sandal-strap", as a phonogram, used to represent "life", "live"
P6	P6	U+132A2	𓊢	ꜥḥꜥ	Rope ladder	
aSA	I1	U+13188	𓆈	ꜥšꜣ	Lizard	
wAH	V29	U+1339D	𓎝	wꜣḥ	Swab	
wAs	S40	U+13300	𓌀	wꜣs, wꜣb	Was Sceptre	
wAD	M13	U+131C5	𓇅	wꜣḏ	Papyrus Stem	
wab	D60	U+130C2	𓃂	wꜥb	Foot with water streaming	Ideogram for pure or clean. Triliteral in Collier and Manley (1998).
N8	N8	U+131F6	𓇶	wbn	Sun with rays	
Aa2	Aa2	U+1340E	𓐎	wḥꜣ	Pustule	
P4	P4	U+132A0	𓊠	wḥꜥ	Boat with net	
wHm	F25	U+13119	𓄙	wḥm	Leg and hoof of an ox	
wsr	F12	U+1310A	𓄊	wsr	Head and neck of jackal	
wsx	S11	U+132DD	𓋝	wsḫ	Broad collar	
wDa	Aa21	U+13423	𓐣	wḏꜥ		
wDb	N20	U+13204	𓈄	wḏb, wdb	Riverbank	
bAs	W2	U+133B0	𓎰	bꜣs		
H2	H2	U+13180	𓆀	pꜣq	Head of a crested bird	
H3	H3	U+13181	𓆁	pꜣq	Head of spoonbill	
F46	F46	U+13132	𓄲	pẖr, dbn	Intestine	Triliteral in Beylage (2018). pẖr "go around"; pẖr.t "prescription, remedy"
N9	N9	U+131F7	𓇷	psḏ	Moon	
N10	N10	U+131F8	𓇸	psḏ		
mAa	Aa11	U+13419	𓐙	mꜣꜥ	Platform	
U4	U4	U+13336	𓌶	mꜣꜥ		Triliteral phonogram per Allen's sign list and Beylage (2018).
G46	G46	U+13176	𓅶	mꜣw		Triliteral phonogram per Allen's sign list and Beylage (2018).
mwt	G14	U+13150	𓅐	mwt	Vulture	
V32	V32	U+133A3	𓎣	msn	Wicker satchel	
S10	S10	U+132DC	𓋜	mḏḥ	Fillet	
nbw	S12	U+132DE	𓋞	nbw		Triliteral in Collier and Manley (1998).
nfr	F35	U+13124	𓄤	nfr	Heart and windpipe	
A17	A17	U+13014	𓀔	nni	Infant	
M22	M22	U+131D1	𓇑	nḫb	Rush	
nTr	R8	U+132B9	𓊹	nṯr	Cloth on pole	
M29	M29	U+131DB	𓇛	nḏm	Carob seed-pod	
rwD	T12	U+13317	𓌗	rwḏ, rwd	Bowstring	
Aa5	Aa5	U+13411	𓐑	ḥip	Part of a ship	Variant with biliteral ḥp.
HqA	S38	U+132FE	𓋾	ḥqꜣ	Crook	
Htp	R4	U+132B5	𓊵	ḥtp	Bread loaf on mat	
Q1	Q1	U+132A8	𓊨	ḥtm	Seat	
T6	T6	U+1330D	𓌍	ḥḏḏ		Triliteral phonogram per Allen's sign list.
xpr	L1	U+131A3	𓆣	ḫpr	Scarab beetle	
xnt	W17	U+133C3	𓏃	ḫnt		
D19	D19	U+13089	𓂉	ḫnt	Nose in profile	ḫntš "plantation", ḫntš "be glad, rejoice"
xrp	S42	U+13302	𓌂	ḫrp		
xrw	P8	U+132A4	𓊤	ḫrw	Oar	
xsf	U34	U+13359	𓍙	ḫsf	Spindle	
U35	U35	U+1335A	𓍚	ḫsf		Variant of U34
Xnm	W9	U+133B8	𓎸	ẖnm	Stone jug	
Z9	Z9	U+133F4	𓏴	zwꜣ, swꜣ	Two sticks crossed	
zwn	T11	U+13315	𓌕	zwn	Arrow	
zmA	F36	U+13125	𓄥	zmꜣ	Lung and windpipe	
F28	F28	U+1311C	𓄜	sꜣb	Cow's skin	
S22	S22	U+132EB	𓋫	sꜣṯ	Shoulder knot	
siA	S32	U+132F7	𓋷	siꜣ	Cloth with fringes	
sbA	N14	U+131FC	𓇼	sbꜣ, dwꜣ	Star	
spr	F42	U+1312D	𓄭	spr	Rib	
S29	S29	U+132F4	𓋴	snb		
S31	S31	U+132F6	𓋶	smꜣ		Triliteral phonogram per Allen's sign list.
snD	G54	U+1317E	𓅾	snḏ,snd	Plucked bird	
sSm	T31	U+1332B	𓌫	sšm	Knife sharpener	
T32	T32	U+1332C	𓌬	sšm		
stp	U21	U+13349	𓍉	stp	Adze and block of wood	
V2	V2	U+1336C	𓍬	sṯꜣ		Triliteral in Beylage (2018).
Aa32	Aa32	U+1342E	𓐮	sṯꜣ, stꜣ	Bow	Triliteral phonogram per Allen's sign list.
Sps	A50	U+1303B	𓀻	šps		Triliteral in Collier and Manley (1998).
Sma	M26	U+131D7	𓇗	šmꜥ	Flowering sedge	
Sms	T18	U+1331E	𓌞	šms	Crook with bundle attached	
Sna	U13	U+13341	𓍁	šnꜥ	Plough	
O43	O43	U+13290	𓊐	šzp	Fence	
Szp	O42	U+1328F	𓊏	šzp	Fence	
V6	V6	U+13371	𓍱	šsr	Cord with ends up	
R5	R5	U+132B6	𓊶	kꜣp	Censer for fumigation	kꜣp "fumigate"; kꜣp "shelter, hut"
grg	U17	U+13345	𓍅	grg	Pick and depression	
G4	G4	U+13142	𓅂	tiw	Buzzard	
S24	S24	U+132ED	𓋭	ṯꜣz	Knotted belt	ṯꜣs "tie (a knot), knit together"; ṯꜣs "spell, utterance, proverb"
S23	S23	U+132EC	𓋬	dmḏ,dmd	Knotted cloth	dmḏ "assemble, unite", dmḏ.yt "assembly"; dmḏ "in total"
G27	G27	U+1315F	𓅟	dšr	Flamingo	
S41	S41	U+13301	𓌁	ḏꜥm	Animal-headed staff	ḏꜥmw "electrum"
DbA	T25	U+13325	𓌥	ḏbꜣ, dbꜣ	Reed float	

== Usage ==
Triliteral signs could be used by themselves to indicate the consonant sequence they represent, or they could more often be written along with phonetic complements, that is, they could appear with uniliteral signs that represent part of their value. Some examples of triliterals with phonetic complementation appear in the table below.

Examples of phonetic complementation with triliterals
Hieroglyph	Example	Transliteration	Meaning
anx	anx n x	ꜥnḫ	'live'
wHm	wHm m Y1V	wḥm	'repeat'
wsr	w wsr s r	wsr	'strong'
nfr	nfr f r	nfr	'good'
stp	s t p stp	stp	'select'

== See also ==
- Transliteration of Ancient Egyptian
- Egyptian uniliteral signs
- Egyptian biliteral signs
- List of Egyptian hieroglyphs

== Notes ==
A.See Allen, 2014, pp. 33-34.
