= Nefer =

Ancient Egyptian hieroglyph for perfect/complete

Nefer in hieroglyphs
nfr
Nefer
nfr
Good/Beautiful

The Egyptian hieroglyph 𓄤 serves as a phonogram representing the triliteral consonant sequence nfr, and appears in Gardiner's sign list as number F35. It appears in the Egyptian word for "perfect, complete" (with the extended meanings of "good, pleasant, well, beautiful"), which has a reconstructed pronunciation of [naːfir] according to Loprieno. The hieroglyph has a conventional Egyptological vocalization of nefer.

== Form and appearance ==
The triliteral Egyptian hieroglyph F35 ('nfr') has sometimes been explained as a representation of a lute; however, Egyptologists today no longer consider this hypothesis likely. Rather than a lute, the hieroglyph is actually a representation of the heart and trachea. It originally may have been the esophagus and heart. The striations of the windpipe only appear in the hieroglyph following the Old Kingdom of Egypt. The lower part of the sign has always clearly been the heart, for the markings clearly follow the form of a sheep's heart.

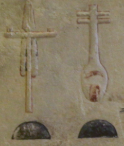
Name of Nefertiabet from the Stele of Nefer-E 15591, 26th century BC, with nefer hieroglyph on right

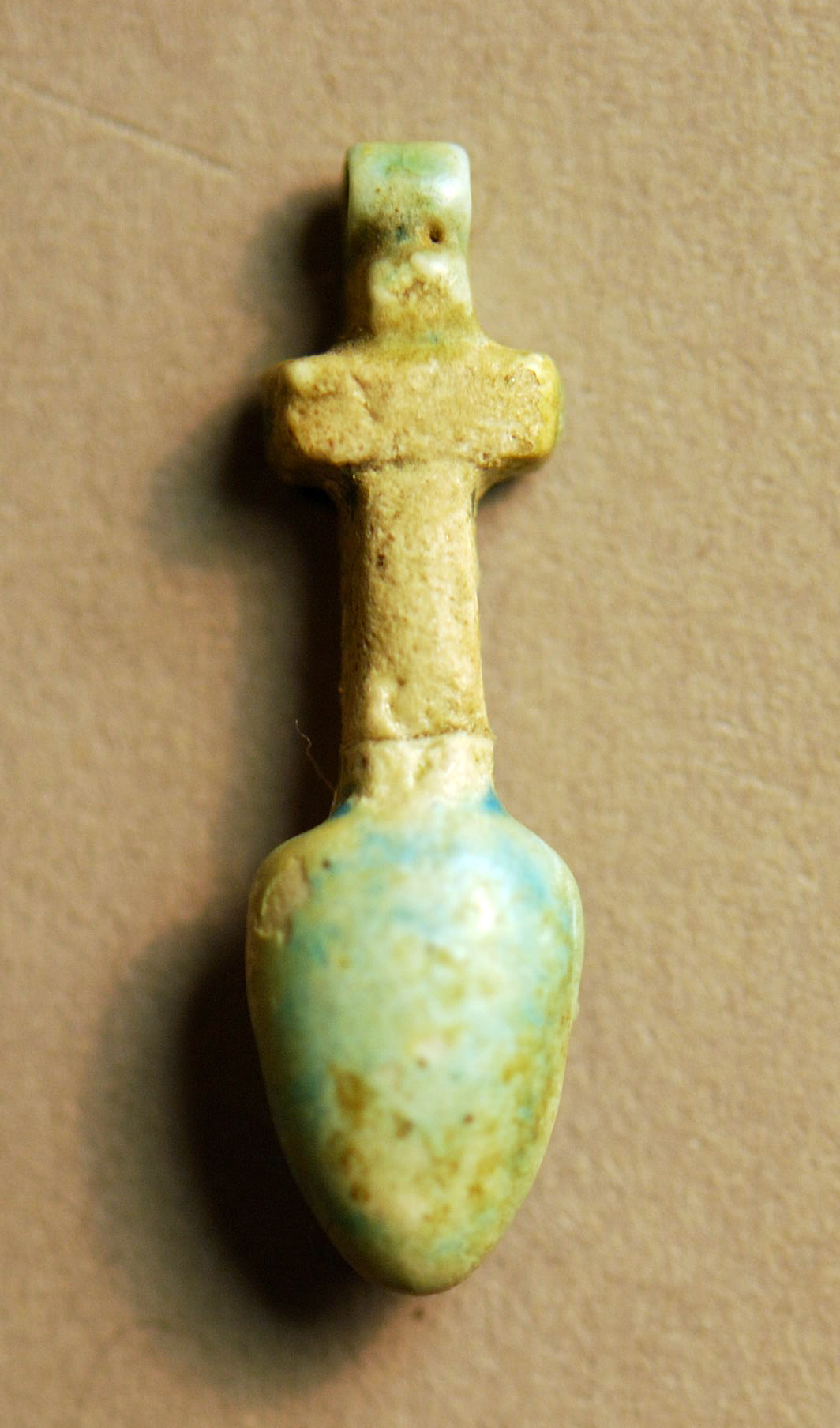
Nefer amulet, 14th century BC

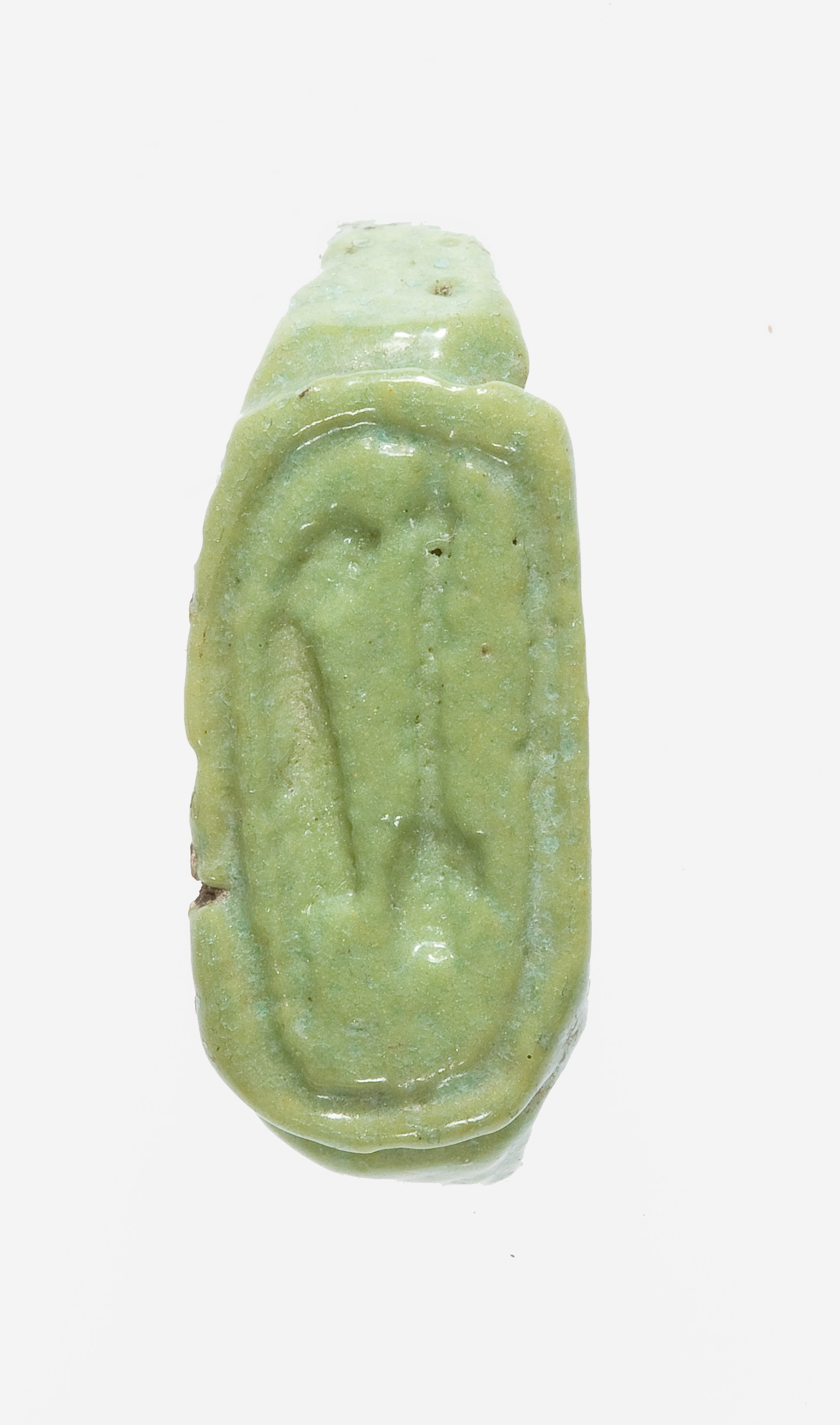
Ring, 14th century BC, with nefer hieroglyph on right

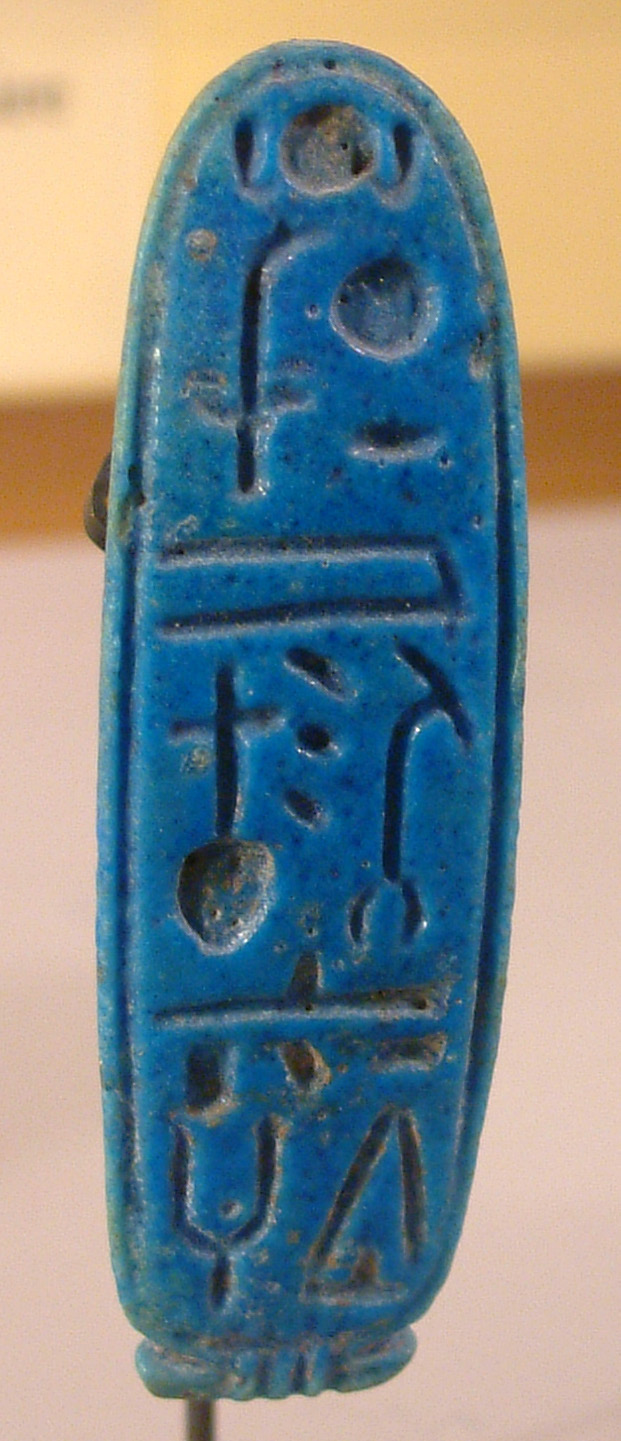
Cartouche amulet, 11th-10th century BC, with nefer hieroglyph on the center left

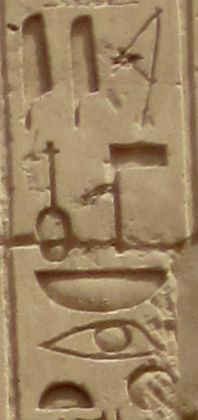
Inscription of Shoshenq I at Karnak, 10th century BC, with nefer hieroglyph on the center left

Hieratic form of nefer hieroglyph from 10th-11th dynasties

Demotic form of the nefer hieroglyph

== Use ==
The use of the hieroglyph nfr in the word for "good, beautiful" is attested in Old Egyptian in the Pyramid Text of Unas, where it could appear alone to represent the word, or with phonetic complements 𓂋 or 𓆑𓂋.

With this meaning, it was incorporated into many names in Ancient Egypt. Examples include Nefertiti, Nefertari, and Neferhotep.

Some scholars suggest that it was used in ancient Egyptian construction where nfrw was used to denote 'level zero' of a building and in accounting where nfr would refer to a zero balance. This last usage used the hieroglyph 𓄤 alone as an abbreviation for nfrw "depletion".

The hieroglyph was also used in a particle nfr meaning "not at all, not even" infrequently in Middle Egyptian.

== See also ==
- Gardiner's sign list § F. Parts of mammals
- List of Egyptian hieroglyphs
