= Egyptian uniliteral signs =

Symbol group in hieroglyphic script

The Egyptian hieroglyphic script contained 24 uniliterals (symbols that stood for single consonants, much like English letters) which today we associate with the 26 glyphs listed below. (Note that the glyph associated with w/u also has a hieratic abbreviation.)

The traditional transliteration system shown on the left of the chart below is over a century old and is the one most commonly seen in texts. It includes several symbols such as 3 for sounds that were of unknown value at the time. Much progress has been made since, though there is still debate as to the details. For instance, it is now thought the 3 may have been an alveolar lateral approximant ("l") in Old Egyptian that was lost by Late Egyptian. Some scholars believe that consonants transcribed as voiced (d, g, dj) may actually have been ejective or, less likely, pharyngealized like the Arabic emphatic consonants. A good description can be found in Allen. For other systems of transliteration, see transliteration of ancient Egyptian.

Uniliteral signs
Sign		Traditional transliteration			Phonetic values per Allen (2000)	
Sign			Say	Notes	Old Egyptian	Middle Egyptian
A	an Egyptian vulture	3	a	called aleph, a glottal stop	[l] or [ɾ]	silent, [j], and [ʔ]
i	a reed	ỉ	i/a	called yodh	an initial or final vowel; sometimes [j]	
i i	a pair of reeds	y	y	double yodh	no record	[j]
y	pair of strokes or river (?)	y	y	double yodh	no record	[j]
a	an arm	ʿ	a	called ayin, a voiced pharyngeal fricative	perhaps [d]	[ʕ]; [d] perhaps retained in some words and dialects
w or W	a quail chick or its hieratic abbreviation	w	w/u	called waw	[w] ~ [u]	
b	a lower leg	b	b		[b] ~ [β]	
p	a reed mat or stool	p	p		aspirated [pʰ]	
f	a horned viper	f	f		[f]	
m	an owl	m	m		[m]	
n	a ripple of water	n	n		[n]	[n], sometimes [l]
r	a mouth	r	r		see image	[ɾ], sometimes [l] (always [l] in some dialects)
h	a reed shelter	h	h		[h]	
H	a twisted wick	ḥ	h	an emphatic h, a voiceless pharyngeal fricative	[ħ]	
x	a placenta	ḫ	kh	a voiceless velar fricative	[x]	
X	an animal belly with tail	ẖ	kh	a softer sound, a voiceless palatal fricative	[ç]	
s	a folded cloth	s	s	Old Egyptian sound for "door bolt" is unknown, but perhaps was z or th	[s]	[s]
z	a door bolt	s	s	Old Egyptian sound for "door bolt" is unknown, but perhaps was z or th	[θ]	[s]
S or N38 or N39	a garden pool	š	sh		[ʃ]	
q	slope of a hill	ḳ or q	k	an emphatic k, a voiceless uvular plosive	ejective [qʼ]	
k	a basket with a handle	k	k		aspirated [kʰ] in some words, palatalized [kʲ]	
g	a jar stand	g	g		ejective [kʼ]	
t	a bun	t	t		aspirated [tʰ]	
T	a tethering rope	ṯ or tj	ch	as in English church	palatalized [tʲ] or [ʧ]	
d	a hand	d	d		ejective [tʼ]	
D	a cobra	ḏ or dj	j	as in English judge	ejective [tʲ’] or [ʧʼ]	

Gardiner lists several variations:

Uniliteral signs
Sign		Traditional transliteration	Notes
V33	bag of linen	g	Appears in a few older words
Aa15	unknown (Possibly: Finger)	m	Originally biliteral im
S3	crown of Lower Egypt	n	Originally ideogram nt for 'crown of Lower Egypt'
U33	pestle	t	Originally biliteral ti

== See also ==
- Transliteration of ancient Egyptian
- Egyptian biliteral signs
- Egyptian triliteral signs
- List of hieroglyphs
