= Harpoon (hieroglyph) =

Egyptian hieroglyph

T21
Harpoon
in hieroglyphs

The ancient Egyptian Harpoon, (archaeological, single-barbed type), is one of the oldest language hieroglyphs from ancient Egypt. It is used on the famous Narmer Palette of Pharaoh Narmer from the 31st century BC, in an archaic hieroglyphic form.

== Language usage of harpoon ==
The hieroglyphic equivalent of the Harpoon is wꜥ, and means "1", a single item, and it is one of the 102 Egyptian biliterals; its use is extensive throughout the language history, and hieroglyphic tomb reliefs and story-telling of Ancient Egypt.

=== Rosetta Stone usage ===
In the 198 BC Rosetta Stone of Ptolemy V Epiphanes, the Harpoon hieroglyph is used only once, in line 8: "crowns, 10 [...] with uraeus on their fronts, on one every among them" ("on each among them").

== Gallery ==
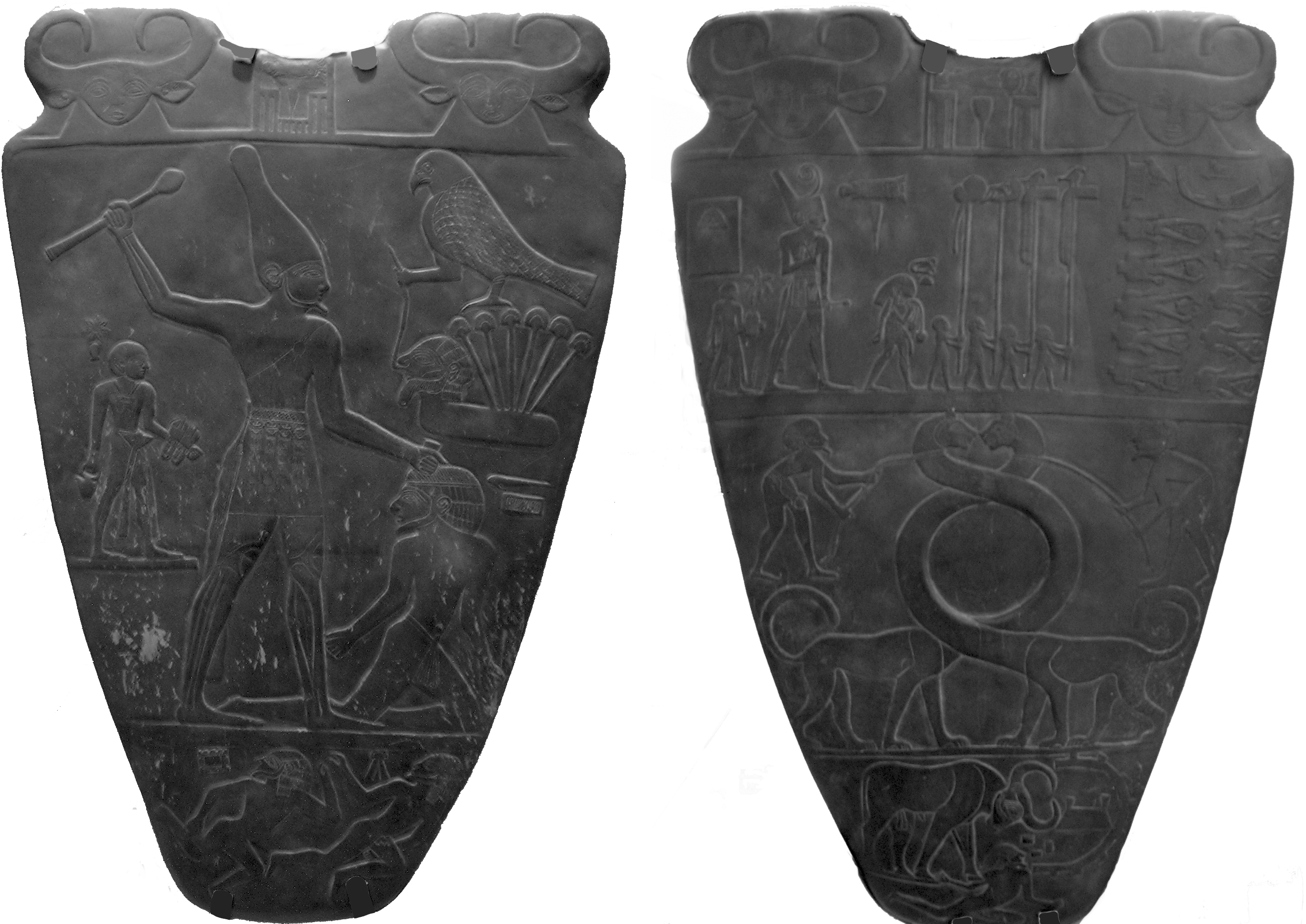
Front side usage of harpoon-(left photo), Narmer Palette

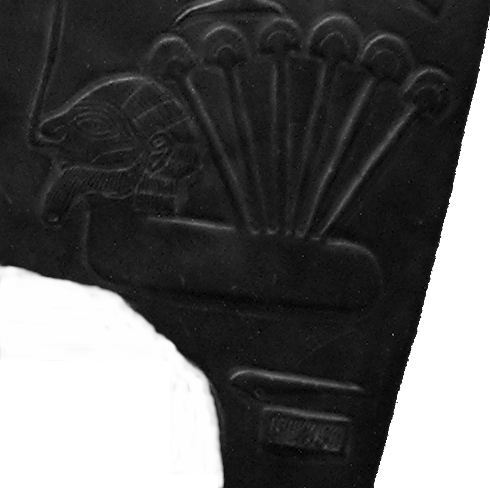
Closeup of archaic form on Narmer Palette

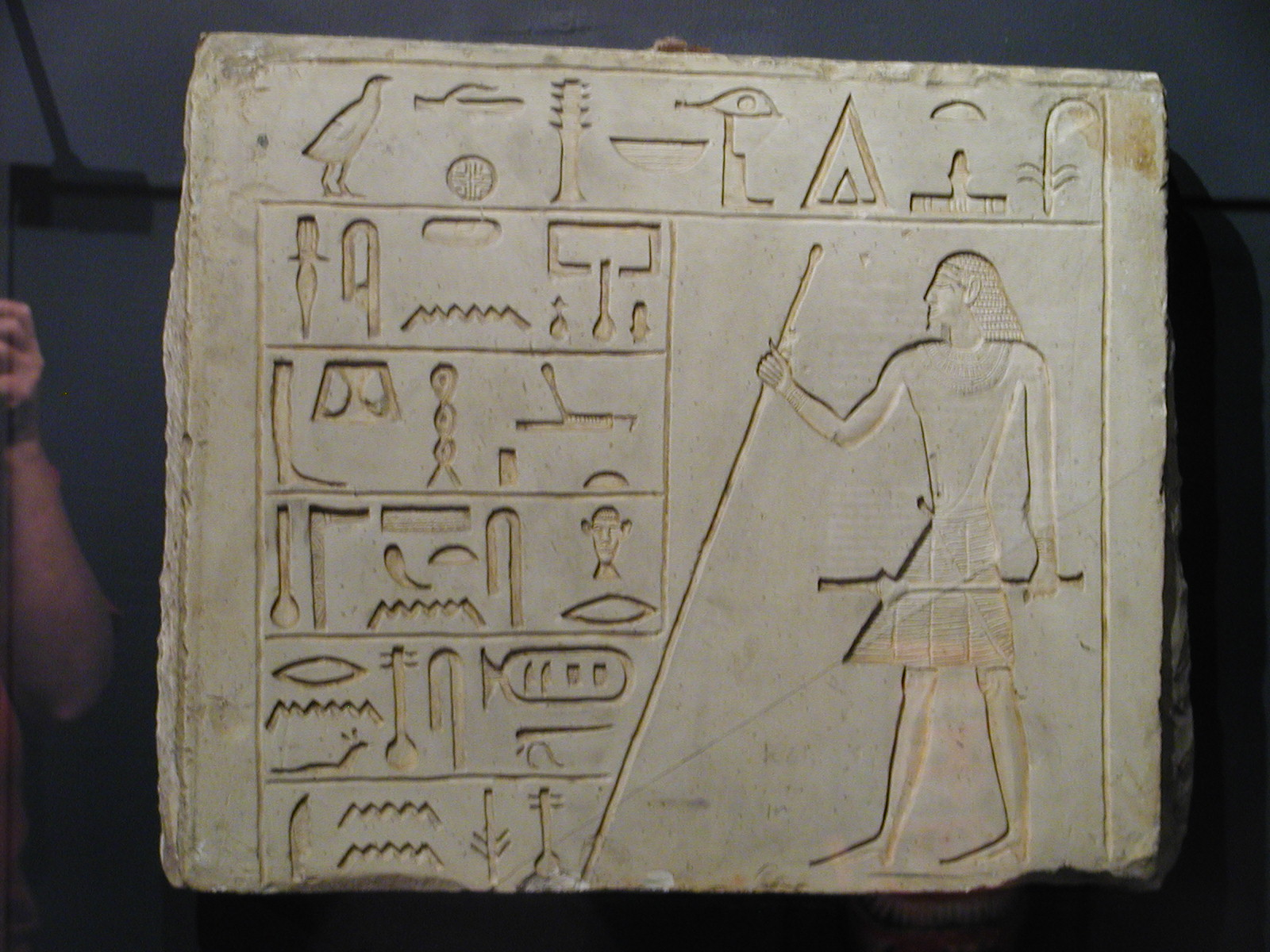
Example usage in text passage

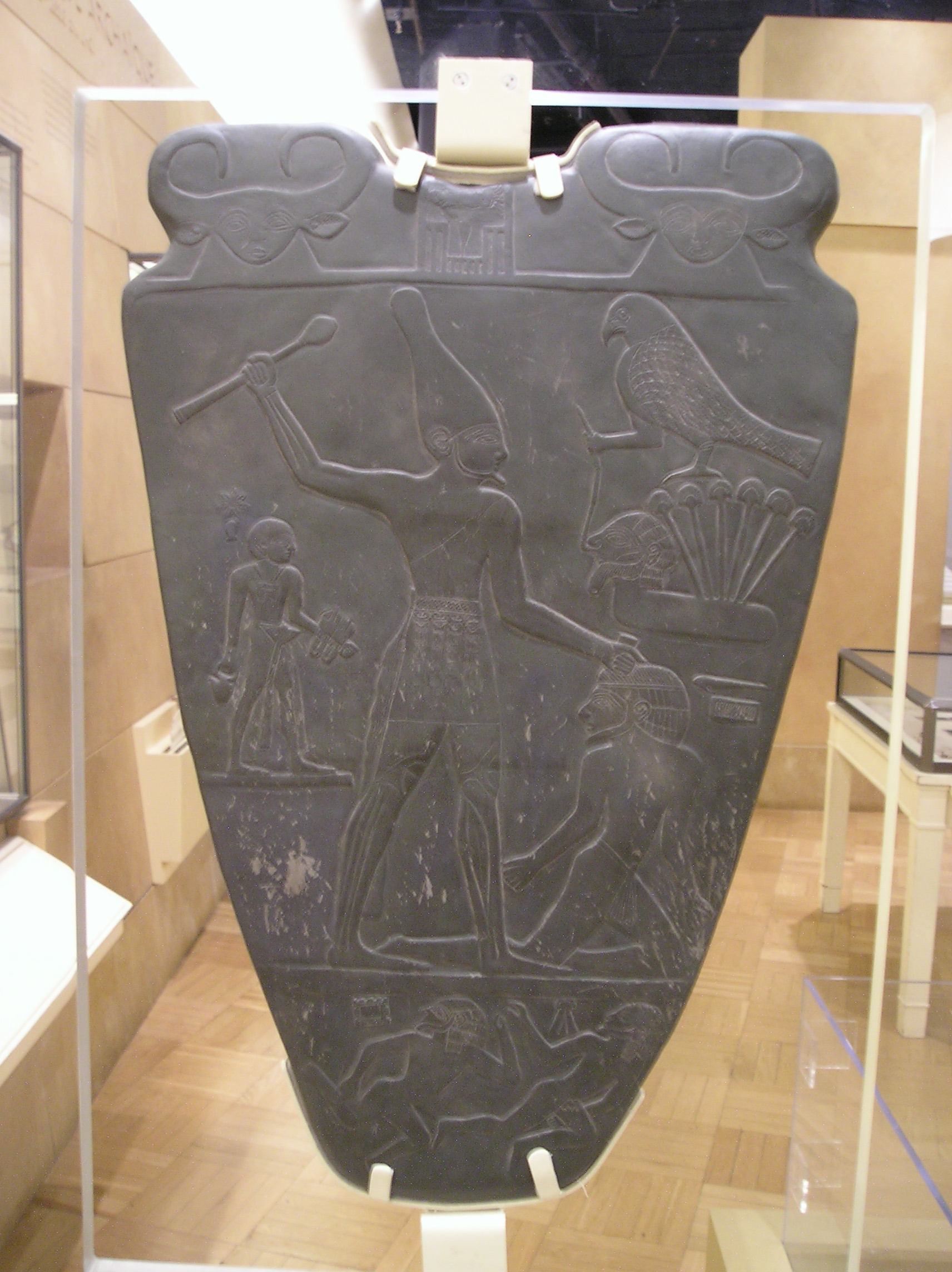
Front of Narmer Palette, using an archaic form of the Harpoon hieroglyph

== See also ==
- Gardiner's Sign List#T. Warfare, Hunting, Butchery
- Gardiner's Sign List#U. Agriculture, Crafts, and Professions
- List of Egyptian hieroglyphs
