= Ankh =

Ancient Egyptian hieroglyphic symbol

The ankh has a T-shape topped by a droplet-shaped loop.

The ankh or key of life is an ancient Egyptian hieroglyphic symbol used to represent the word for "life" and, by extension, as a symbol of life itself.

The ankh has a T-shape topped by a droplet-shaped loop. It was used in writing as a triliteral sign, representing a sequence of three consonants, Ꜥ-n-ḫ. This sequence was found in several Egyptian words, including the terms for "mirror", "floral bouquet", and "life". The symbol often appeared in Egyptian art as a physical object representing either life or related life-giving substances such as air or water. Commonly depicted in the hands of ancient Egyptian deities, sometimes being given by them to the pharaoh, it represents their power to sustain life and to revive human souls in the afterlife.

The ankh was a widespread decorative motif in ancient Egypt, also used decoratively by neighbouring cultures. Copts adapted it into the crux ansata, a shape with a circular rather than droplet loop, and used it as a variant of the Christian cross. The ankh came into widespread use in Western culture in the 1960s, appearing as a symbol of African cultural identity, Neopagan belief systems, and later, the goth subculture.

== Use in writing ==
S34 n Aa1 S34
Ꜥnḫ
in hieroglyphs

In ancient Egyptian hieroglyphic writing, the ankh was a triliteral sign: one that represented a sequence of three consonant sounds. The ankh stood for the sequence Ꜥ-n-ḫ, where n is pronounced like the English letter n, Ꜥ is a voiced pharyngeal fricative, and ḫ is a voiceless or voiced velar fricative (sounds not found in English). In the Egyptian language, these consonants were found in the verb meaning "live", the noun meaning "life", and words derived from them, such as sꜥnḫ, which means "cause to live" or "nourish"; ꜥnḫ evolved into ⲱⲛϩ (ōnh) in the Coptic stage of the language. The sign is known in English as the "ankh", based on the hypothetical pronunciation of the Egyptian word, or as the "key of life", based on its meaning.

One of the common uses of the word ꜥnḫ was to express a wish that a particular person live. For example, a phrase meaning something like "may you be healthy and alive" was used in polite contexts, similar to the English phrase "if you please", and the phrase ꜥnḫ wḏꜣ snb, meaning "alive, sound, and healthy", was used as an honorific for the pharaoh when he was mentioned in writing. The Egyptian word for "oath" was also ꜥnḫ, because oaths in ancient Egypt began with a form of the word "live".

The same consonants were found in the word for "mirror" and the word for a floral bouquet, so the sign was also used in writing these words. The three consonants also compose the word for a looped rope-like object found in illustrations on many coffins from the Middle Kingdom (c. 2050–1650 BC). The Egyptologists Battiscombe Gunn and Alan Gardiner, in the early 20th century, believed these objects to be sandal straps, given that they appear in pairs at the foot of the coffin and the accompanying texts say the objects are "on the ground under his feet".

== Origins ==
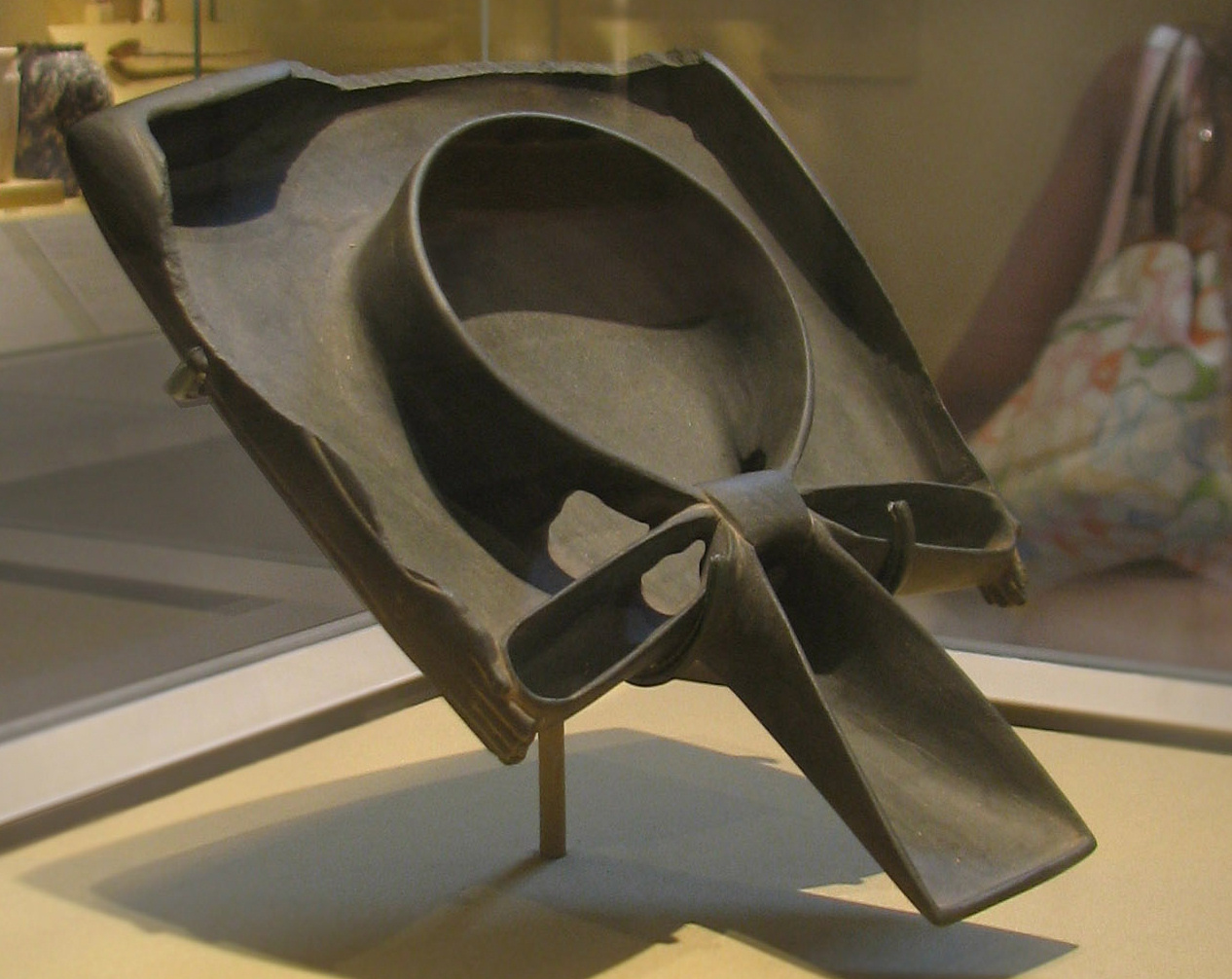
First Dynasty stone dish in the shape of an ankh embraced by a pair of arms representing the ka

Early examples of the ankh sign date to the First Dynasty (c. 30th to 29th century BC). There is little agreement on what physical object the sign originally represented. Many scholars believe the sign is a knot formed of a flexible material such as cloth or reeds, as early versions of the sign show the lower bar of the ankh as two separate lengths of flexible material that seem to correspond to the two ends of the knot. These early versions bear a resemblance to the tyet symbol, a sign that represented the concept of "protection". For these reasons, the Egyptologists Heinrich Schäfer and Henry Fischer thought the two signs had a common origin, and they regarded the ankh as a knot that was used as an amulet rather than for any practical purpose.

Hieroglyphic writing used pictorial signs to represent sounds, so that, for example, the hieroglyph for a house could represent the sounds p-r, which were found in the Egyptian word for "house". This practice, known as the rebus principle, allowed the Egyptians to write the words for things that could not be pictured, such as abstract concepts. Gardiner believed the ankh originated in this way. He pointed out that the sandal-strap illustrations on Middle Kingdom coffins resemble the hieroglyph, and he argued that the sign originally represented knots like these and came to be used in writing all other words that contained the consonants Ꜥ-n-ḫ. Gardiner's list of hieroglyphic signs labels the ankh as S34, placing it within the category for items of clothing and just after S33, the hieroglyph for a sandal. Gardiner's hypothesis persists; James P. Allen, in an introductory book on the Egyptian language published in 2014, assumes that the sign originally meant "sandal strap" and uses it as an example of the rebus principle in hieroglyphic writing.

Various authors have argued that the sign originally represented something other than a knot. Some have suggested that it had a sexual meaning. For instance, Thomas Inman, an amateur mythologist in the nineteenth century, thought the sign represented the male and female reproductive organs, joined into a single sign. Victor Loret, a nineteenth-century Egyptologist, argued that "mirror" was the sign's original meaning. A problem with this argument, which Loret acknowledged, is that deities are frequently shown holding the ankh by its loop, and their hands pass through it where the solid reflecting surface of an ankh-shaped mirror would be. Andrew Gordon, an Egyptologist, and Calvin Schwabe, a veterinarian, argue that the origin of the ankh is related to two other signs of uncertain origin that often appear alongside it: the was-sceptre, representing "power" or "dominion", and the djed pillar, representing "stability". According to this hypothesis, the form of each sign is drawn from a part of the anatomy of a bull, like some other hieroglyphic signs that are known to be based on body parts of animals. In Egyptian belief semen was connected with life and, to some extent, with "power" or "dominion", and some texts indicate the Egyptians believed semen originated in the bones. Therefore, Gordon and Schwabe suggest the signs are based on parts of the bull's anatomy through which semen was thought to pass: the ankh is a thoracic vertebra, the djed is the sacrum and lumbar vertebrae, and the was is the dried penis of the bull.

== Use in religion and art ==
In Egyptian belief, life was a force that circulated throughout the world. Individual living things, including humans, were manifestations of this force and fundamentally tied to it. Life came into existence at the creation of the world, and cyclical events like the rising and setting of the sun were thought of as reenactments of the original events of creation that maintained and renewed life in the cosmos. Sustaining life was thus the central function of the deities who governed these natural cycles. Therefore, the ankh was frequently depicted being held in gods' hands, representing their life-giving power. The Egyptians also believed that when they died, their individual lives could be renewed in the same manner as life in general. For this reason, the gods were often depicted in tombs giving ankh signs to humans, usually the pharaoh. As the sign represented the power to bestow life, humans other than the pharaoh were rarely shown receiving or holding the ankh before the end of the Middle Kingdom, although this convention weakened thereafter. The pharaoh to some extent represented Egypt as a whole, so by giving the sign to him, the gods granted life to the entire nation.

By extension of the concept of "life", the ankh could signify air or water. In artwork, gods hold the ankh up to the nose of the king: offering him the breath of life. Hand fans were another symbol of air in Egyptian iconography, and the human servants who normally carried fans behind the king were sometimes replaced in artwork by personified ankh signs with arms. In scenes of ritual purification, in which water was poured over the king or a deceased commoner, the zigzag lines that normally represented water could be replaced by chains of ankh signs.

The ankh may have been used decoratively more than any other hieroglyphic sign. Mirrors, mirror cases, and floral bouquets were made in its shape, given that the sign was used in writing the name of each of these objects. Some other objects, such as libation vessels and sistra, were also shaped like the sign. The sign appeared very commonly in the decoration of architectural forms such as the walls and shrines within temples. In contexts such as these, the sign often appeared together with the was and djed signs, which together signified "life, dominion, and stability". In some decorative friezes in temples, all three signs, or the ankh and was alone, were positioned above the hieroglyph for a basket that represented the word "all": "all life and power" or "all life, power, and stability". Some deities, such as Ptah and Osiris, could be depicted holding a was scepter that incorporated elements of the ankh and djed.

Amulets made in the shape of hieroglyphic signs were meant to impart to the wearer the qualities represented by the sign. The Egyptians wore amulets in daily life as well as placing them in tombs to ensure the well-being of the deceased in the afterlife. Ankh-shaped amulets first appeared late in the Old Kingdom (c. 2700 to 2200 BC) and continued to be used into the late first millennium BC, yet they were rare, despite the importance of the symbol. Amulets shaped like a composite sign that incorporated the ankh, was, and djed were more widespread.

Ankh signs in two-dimensional art were typically painted blue or black. The earliest ankh amulets were often made of gold or electrum, a gold and silver alloy. Egyptian faience, a ceramic that was usually blue or green, was the most common material for ankh amulets in later times, perhaps because its color represented life and regeneration.

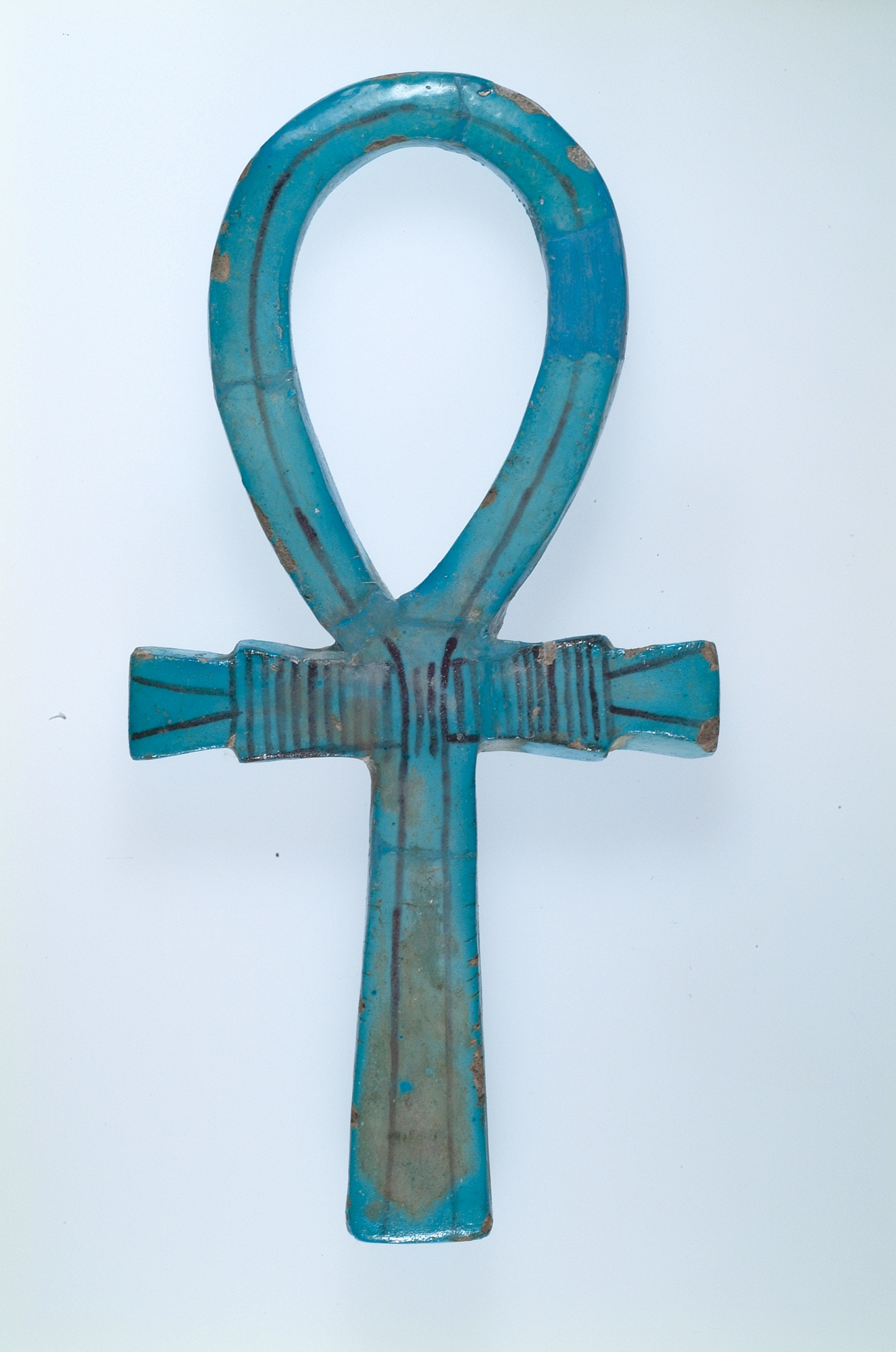
An ankh made of Egyptian faience

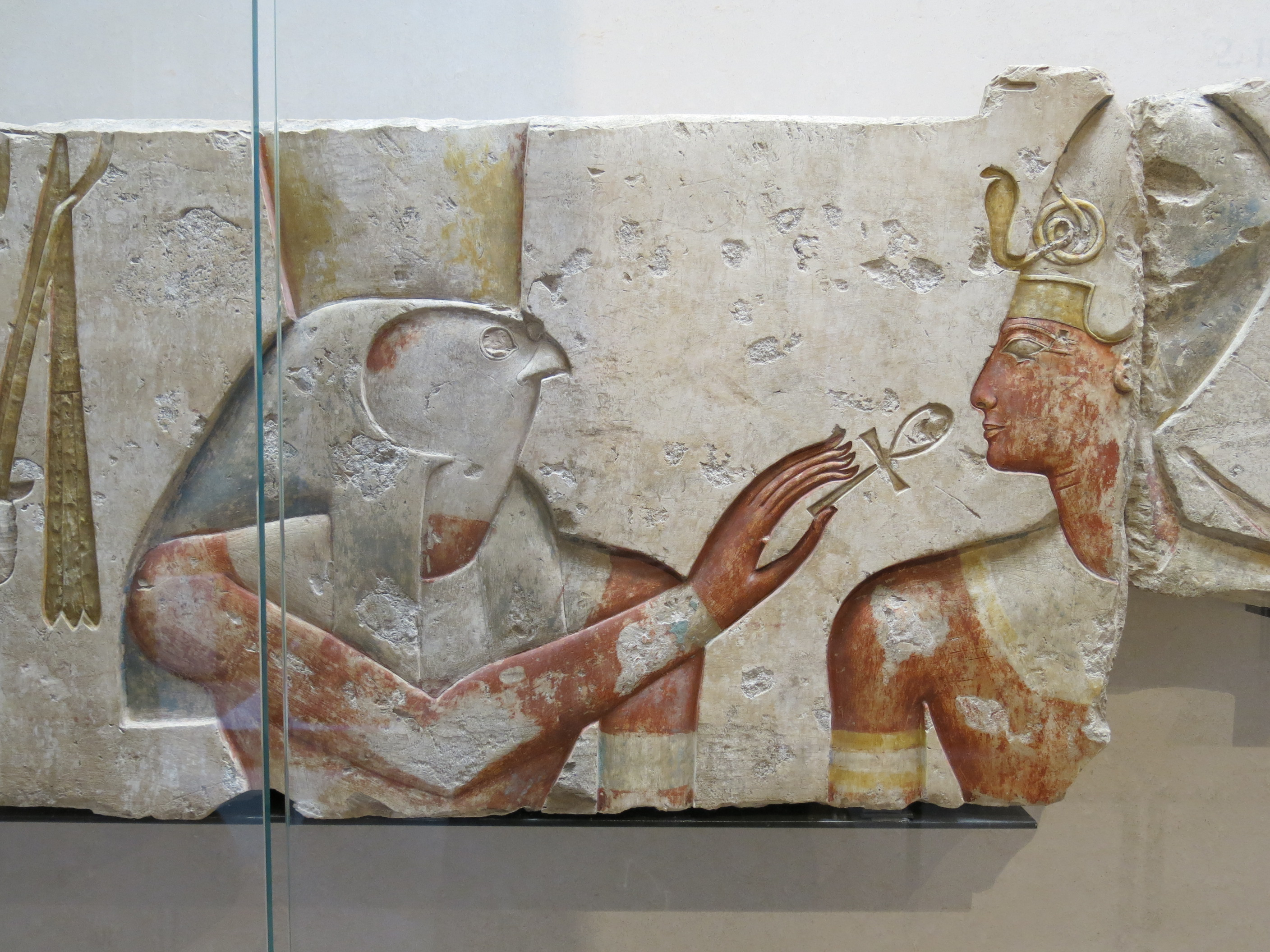
The god Horus using a ankh to offer life to the king, Ramesses II.

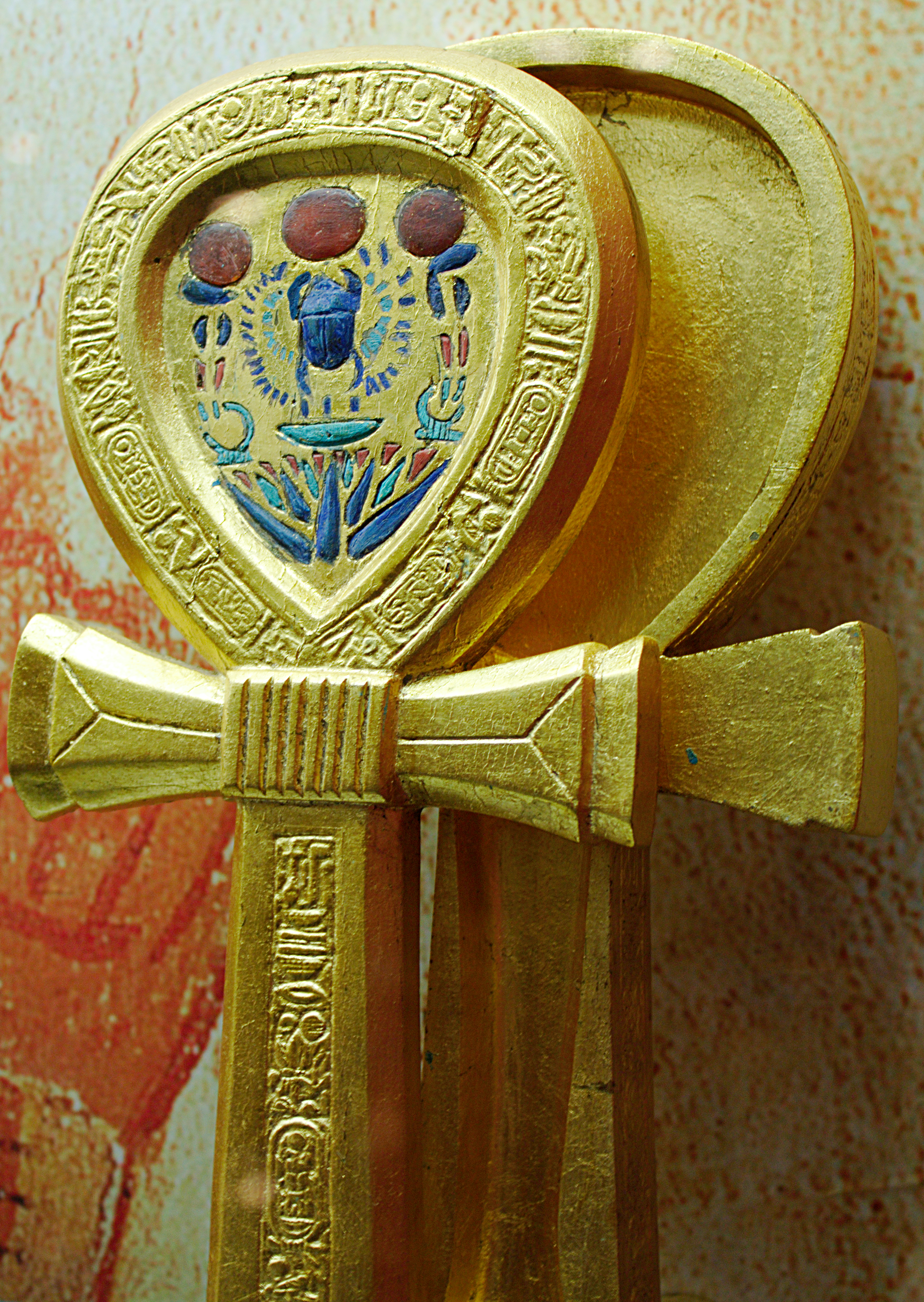
Ankh-shaped mirror case from the tomb of Tutankhamun

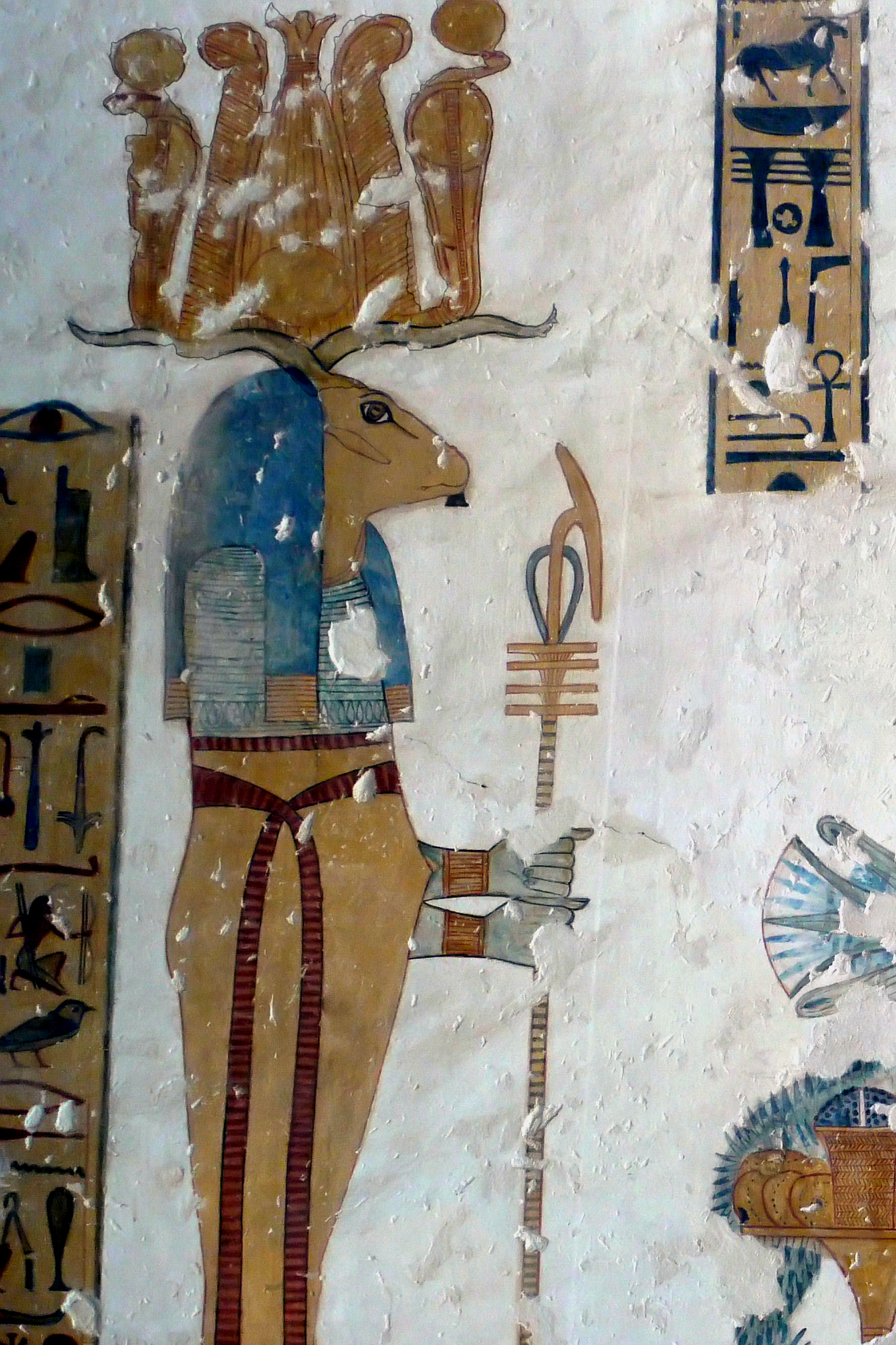
The god Banebdjedet with a scepter combining the was and djed with the ankh

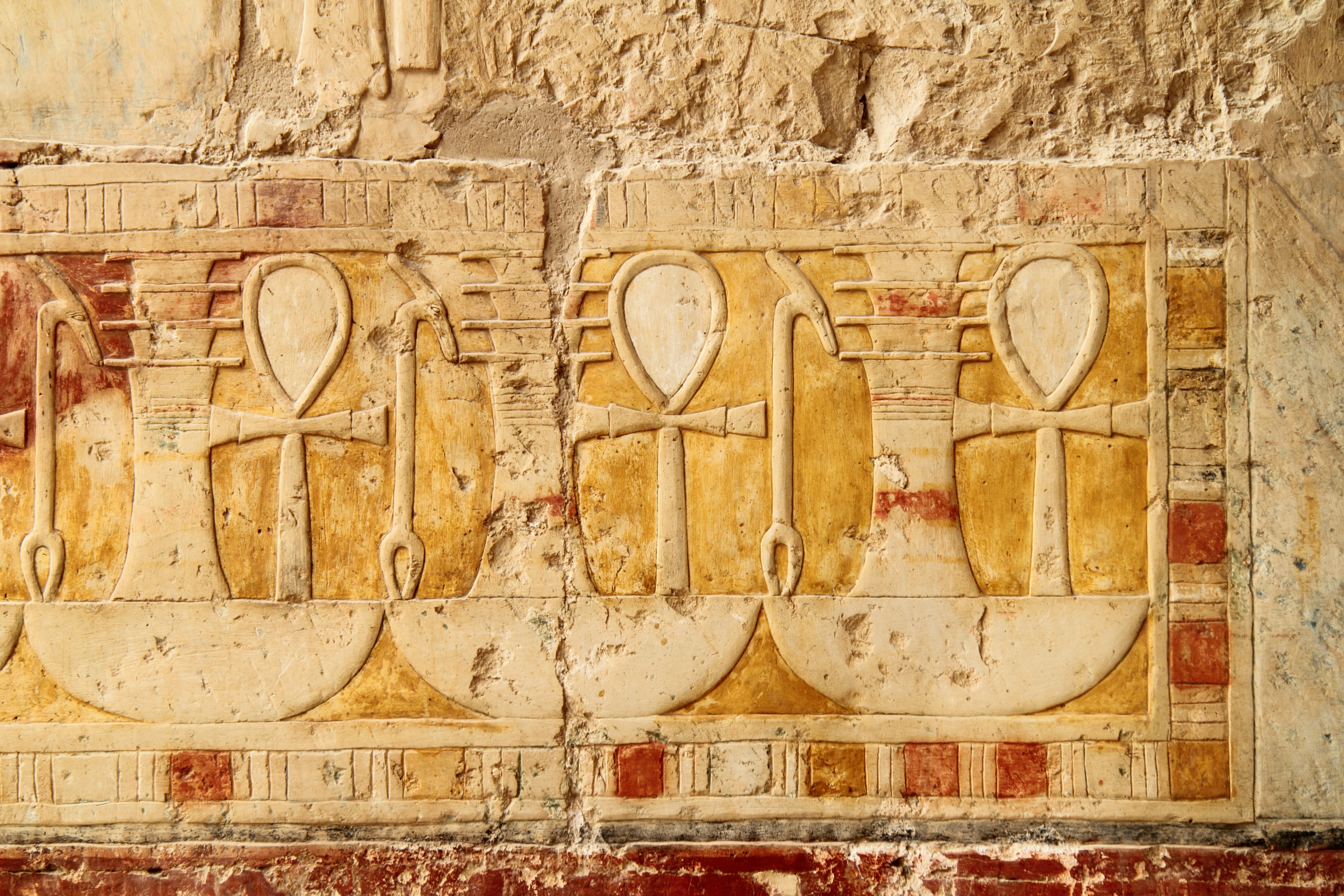
Frieze of ankh, djed, and was signs atop the hieroglyph for "all"

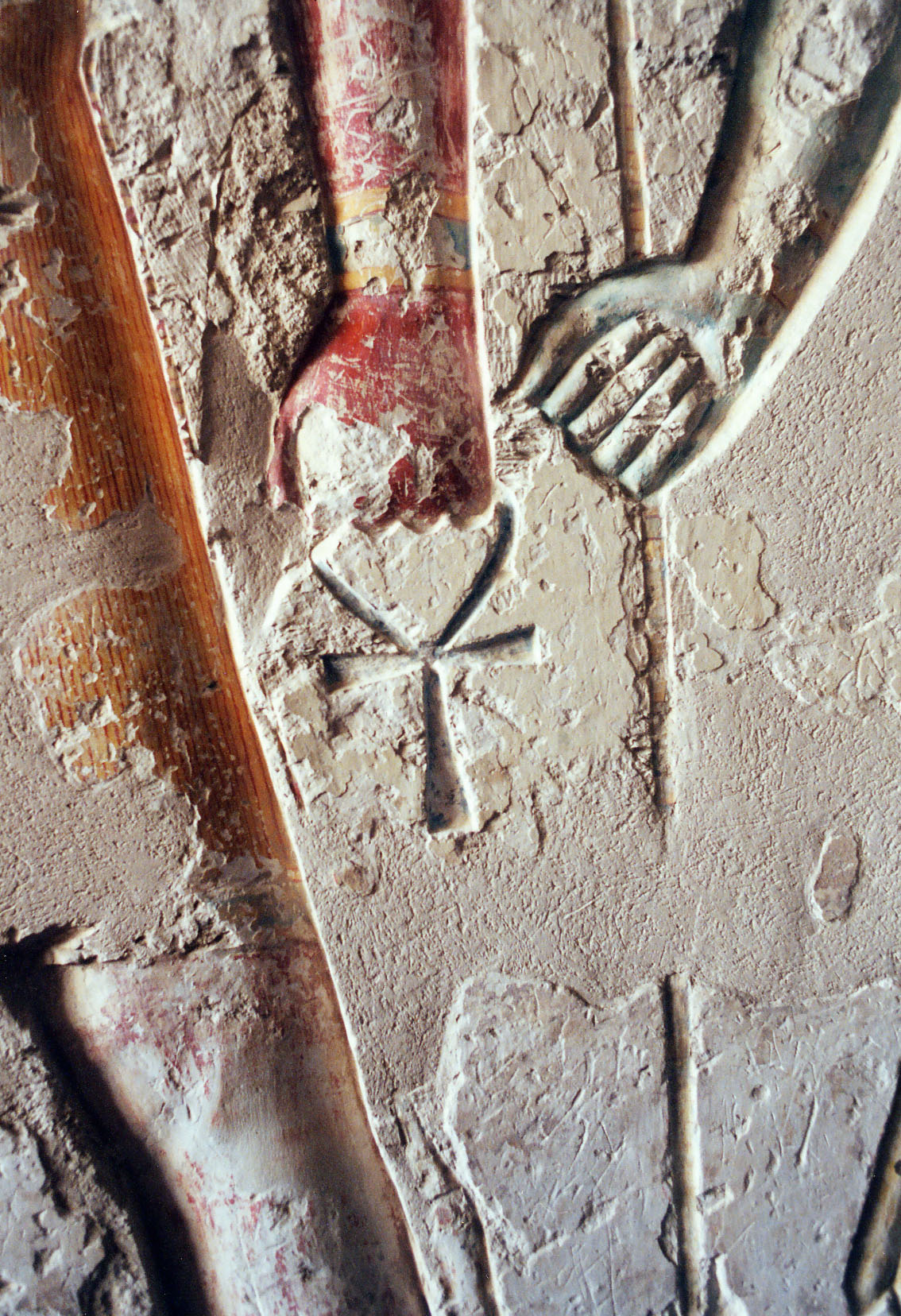
Detail of the ankh held from KV2

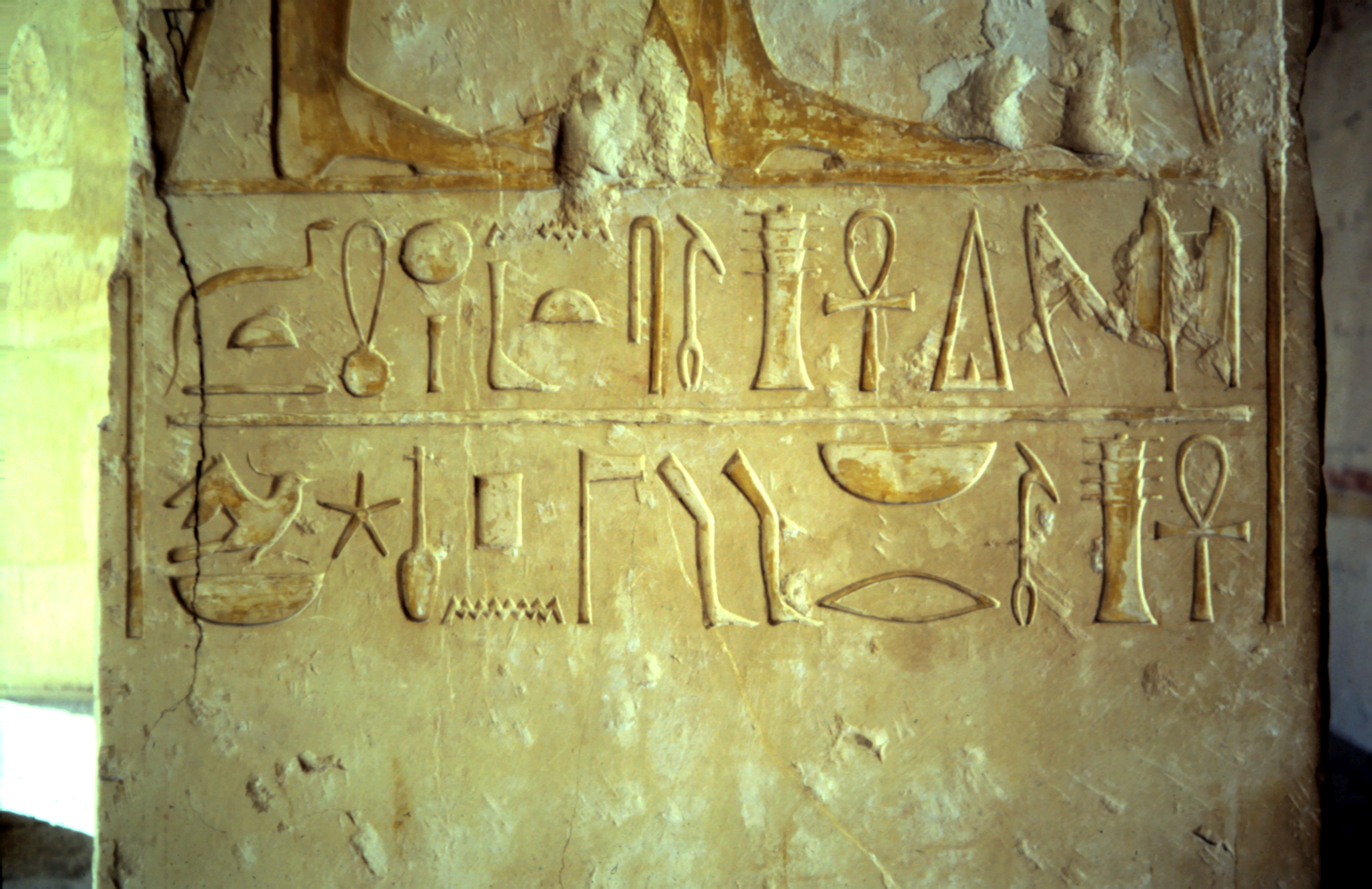
Hieroglyphic inscription at Deir el-Bahari featuring ankh

== Other ancient cultures ==
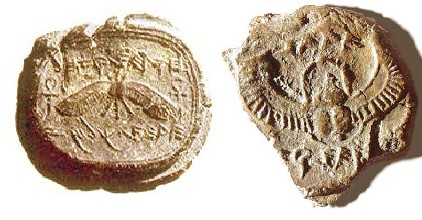
Imprint of a seal impression of King Hezekiah with ankhs

The people of Syria and Canaan adopted many Egyptian artistic motifs during the Middle Bronze Age (c. 1950–1500 BC), including hieroglyphs, of which the ankh was by far the most common. It was often placed next to various figures in artwork or shown being held by Egyptian deities who had come to be worshipped in the ancient Near East. It was sometimes used to represent water or fertility. Elsewhere in the Near East, the sign was incorporated into Anatolian hieroglyphs to represent the word for "life", and the sign was used in the artwork of the Minoan civilization centered on Crete. Minoan artwork sometimes combined the ankh, or the related tyet sign, with the Minoan double axe emblem.

Artwork in the Meroitic Kingdom, which lay south of Egypt and was heavily influenced by its religion, features the ankh prominently. It appears in temples and funerary art in many of the same contexts as in Egypt, and it is also one of the most common motifs in the decoration of Meroitic pottery.

Use of the ankh persisted in Israel into the Iron Age. In 2015, a clay seal (or bulla) belonging to King Hezekiah of Judah (c. 700 BC) was discovered in Jerusalem, which featured ankhs on either side of a winged sun figure.

== Christianity ==
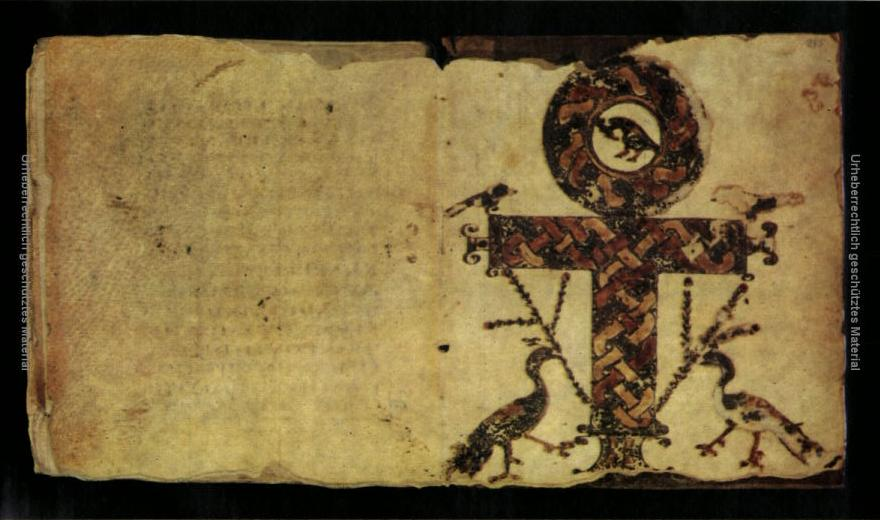
A crux ansata in Codex Glazier, a Coptic manuscript of the New Testament, 4th to 5th century AD

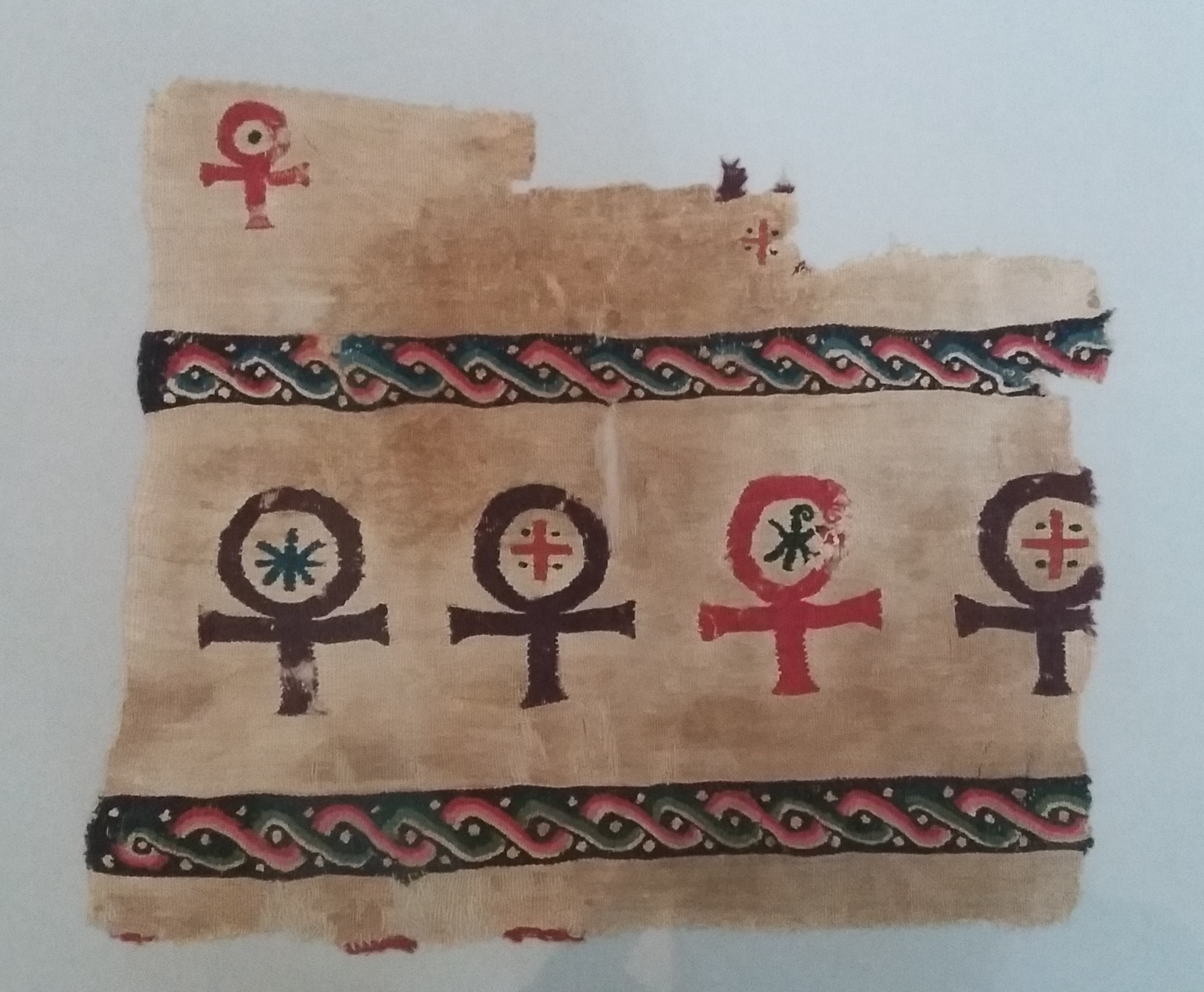
Crux ansata signs on a piece of cloth, 4th to 5th century AD

The ankh was one of the few ancient Egyptian artistic motifs that continued to be used after the Christianization of Egypt during the 4th and 5th centuries AD. The ankh is easily confused with the Christian cross. It resembles the staurogram, a sign that resembles a Christian cross with a loop to the right of the upper bar and was used by early Christians as a monogram for Jesus, as well as the crux ansata, or "handled cross", which is shaped like an ankh with a circular rather than oval or teardrop-shaped loop. The staurogram has been suggested to be influenced by the ankh, but the earliest Christian uses of the sign date to around AD 200, well before the earliest Christian adoption of the ankh. The earliest known example of a crux ansata comes from a copy of the Gospel of Judas from the 3rd or early 4th century AD. The adoption of this sign may have been influenced by the staurogram, the ankh, or both.

According to Socrates of Constantinople, when Christians were dismantling Alexandria's greatest temple, the Serapeum, in 391 AD, they noticed cross-like signs inscribed on the stone blocks. Pagans who were present said the sign meant "life to come", an indication that the sign Socrates referred to was the ankh; Christians claimed the sign was their own, indicating that they could easily regard the ankh as a crux ansata.

There is little evidence for the use of the crux ansata in the western half of the Roman Empire, but Egyptian Coptic Christians used it in many media, particularly in the decoration of textiles.

Some modern interpretations note that the ankh continued to appear in Coptic contexts in Egypt, where it was visually adapted within Christian art and material culture, particularly in decorative forms that echo its earlier Egyptian symbolism.

== Modern use ==
Much more recently, the ankh has become a popular symbol in modern Western culture, particularly as a design for jewelry and tattoos. Its resurgence began when the counterculture of the 1960s stirred a greater interest in ancient religions. It is sometimes used by people of African descent in the United States and Europe as a symbol of African cultural identity. The ankh also symbolizes Kemetism, a group of religious movements based on the religion of ancient Egypt. The sign is also popular in the goth subculture, being particularly associated with vampires, because an ankh pendant appears prominently in the 1983 vampire film The Hunger. In the 21st century it is the most widely recognized symbol of Egyptian origin, or more broadly of African origin, in the Western world.

The sign is incorporated twice in the Unicode standard for encoding text and symbols in computing. It appears as U+2625 (☥) in the Miscellaneous Symbols block, and as U+132F9 (𓋹) in the Egyptian Hieroglyphs block.

Character information
Preview	☥		𓋹	
Unicode name	ANKH		EGYPTIAN HIEROGLYPH S034	
Encodings	decimal	hex	dec	hex
Unicode	9765	U+2625	78585	U+132F9
UTF-8	226 152 165	E2 98 A5	240 147 139 185	F0 93 8B B9
UTF-16	9765	2625	55308 57081	D80C DEF9
Numeric character reference	&#9765;	&#x2625;	&#78585;	&#x132F9;

== Works cited ==
- Allen, James P. (2014). Middle Egyptian: An Introduction to the Language and Culture of Hieroglyphs, Third Edition. Cambridge University Press. ISBN 978-1-107-05364-9.
- Andrews, Carol (1994). Amulets of Ancient Egypt. University of Texas Press. ISBN 978-0-292-70464-0.
- Baines, John (1975). "Ankh-Sign, Belt and Penis Sheath". Studien zur Altägyptischen Kultur. 3: 1–24. JSTOR 25149982.
- Bardill, Jonathan (2012). Constantine, Divine Emperor of the Christian Golden Age. Cambridge University Press. ISBN 978-0-521-76423-0.
- Du Bourguet, Pierre (1991). "Art Survivals from Ancient Egypt". In Atiya, Aziz Suryal (ed.). The Coptic Encyclopedia. Vol. I. Macmillan. ISBN 978-0-02-897025-7.
- Elhassan, Ahmed Abuelgasim (2004). Religious Motifs in Meroitic Painted and Stamped Pottery. Archaeopress. ISBN 978-1-84171-377-9.
- Finnestad, Ragnhild Bjerre (1989). "Egyptian Thought about Life as a Problem of Translation". In Englund, Gertie (ed.). The Religion of the Ancient Egyptians: Cognitive Structures and Popular Expressions. S. Academiae Upsaliensis. pp. 29–38. ISBN 978-91-554-2433-6.
- Fischer, Henry G. (1972). "Some Emblematic Uses of Hieroglyphs with Particular Reference to an Archaic Ritual Vessel". Metropolitan Museum Journal. 5: 5–23. doi:10.2307/1512625. JSTOR 1512625. S2CID 191367344.
- Gardiner, Alan (1915). "Life and Death (Egyptian)". In Hastings, James (ed.). The Encyclopedia of Religion and Ethics. Vol. VIII. pp. 19–25.
- Gordon, Andrew H.; Schwabe, Calvin (2004). The Quick and the Dead: Biomedical Theory in Ancient Egypt. Brill / Styx. ISBN 978-90-04-12391-5.
- Hill, Jane A. (2010). "Window between Worlds: The Ankh as a Dominant Theme in Five Middle Kingdom Funerary Monuments". In Hawass, Zahi; Houser Wegner, Jennifer (eds.). Millions of Jubilees: Studies in Honor of David P. Silverman. American University in Cairo Press. pp. 227–247. ISBN 978-977-704-084-6.
- Hurtado, Larry W. (2006). The Earliest Christian Artifacts: Manuscripts and Christian Origins. Eerdmans. ISBN 978-0-8028-2895-8.
- Issitt, Micah L.; Main, Carlyn (2014). Hidden Religion: The Greatest Mysteries and Symbols of the World's Religious Beliefs. ABC-CLIO. ISBN 978-1-61069-477-3.
- Ladouceur, Liisa (2011). Encyclopedia Gothica. Illustrations by Gary Pullin. ECW Press. ISBN 978-1-77041-024-4.
- Marinatos, Nanno (2010). Minoan Kingship and the Solar Goddess: A Near Eastern Koine. University of Illinois Press. ISBN 978-0-252-03392-6.
- Teissier, Beatrice (1996). Egyptian Iconography on Syro-Palestinian Cylinder Seals of the Middle Bronze Age. Academic Press Fribourg / Vandenhoeck & Ruprecht Göttingen. ISBN 978-3-7278-1039-8 / ISBN 978-3-525-53892-0
- Tobin, Vincent Arieh (1989). Theological Principles of Egyptian Religion. P. Lang. ISBN 978-0-8204-1082-1.
- "Unicode 13.0 Character Code Charts: Egyptian Hieroglyphs" (PDF). Unicode Consortium. 2020a.
- "Unicode 13.0 Character Code Charts: Miscellaneous Symbols" (PDF). Unicode Consortium. 2020b.
- Webb, Stephen (2018). Clash of Symbols: A Ride Through the Riches of Glyphs. Springer. ISBN 978-3-319-71350-2.
- Wilkinson, Richard H. (1992). Reading Egyptian Art: A Hieroglyphic Guide to Ancient Egyptian Painting and Sculpture. Thames & Hudson. ISBN 978-0-500-05064-4.
