= Egyptian biliteral signs =

Hieroglyphs representing two consonants

The biliteral Egyptian hieroglyphs are hieroglyphs which represent a specific sequence of two consonants. The listed hieroglyphs focus on the consonant combinations rather than their meaning.

Unicode		Gardiner	Transl.
𓄫	U+1312B	F40	ꜣw
𓍋	U+1334B	U23	ꜣb
𓅜	U+1315C	G25	ꜣḫ
𓇇	U+131C7	M15	ꜣḫ
𓂻	U+130BB	D54	jw
𓃛	U+130DB	E9	jw
𓃙	U+130D9	E8	jb
𓃚	U+130DA	E8a	jb
𓄣	U+13123	F34	jb
𓏶	U+133F6	Z11	jm
𓐝	U+1341D	Aa15	jm
𓀟	U+1301F	A27	jn
𓆛	U+1319B	K1	jn
𓏌	U+133CC	W24	jn
𓏎	U+133CE	W25	jn
𓀹	U+13039	A48	jr
𓁹	U+13079	D4	jr
𓌤	U+13324	T24	jḥ
𓇩	U+131E9	M40	jz
𓊨	U+132A8	Q1	js
𓄼	U+1313C	F51c	js
𓀗	U+13017	A19	jk
𓆊	U+1318A	I3	jt
𓎁	U+13381	V15	jṯ
𓉻	U+1327B	O29	ꜥꜣ
𓄏	U+1310F	F16	ꜥb
𓌤	U+13324	T24	ꜥḥ
𓅧	U+13167	G35	ꜥq
𓆝	U+1319D	K3	ꜥḏ
𓎙	U+13399	V26	ꜥḏ
𓎚	U+1339A	V27	ꜥḏ
𓍯	U+1336F	V4	wꜣ
𓌡	U+13321	T21	wꜥ
𓄋	U+1310B	F13	wp
𓃹	U+130F9	E34	wn
𓇬	U+131EC	M42	wn
𓅨	U+13168	G36	wr
𓄼	U+1313C	F51c	ws
𓊨	U+132A8	Q1	ws
𓊩	U+132A9	Q2	ws
𓇅	U+131C5	M13	wḏ
𓎗	U+13397	V24	wḏ
𓎘	U+13398	V25	wḏ
𓅡	U+13161	G29	bꜣ
𓎺	U+133BA	W10	bꜣ
𓎻	U+133BB	W10a	bꜣ
𓄑	U+13111	F18	bḥ
𓆟	U+1319F	K5	bs
𓅮	U+1316E	G40	pꜣ
𓅯	U+1316F	G41	pꜣ
𓉐	U+13250	O1	pr
𓄖	U+13116	F22	pḥ
𓂾	U+130BE	D56	pd
𓌒	U+13312	T9	pḏ
𓌳	U+13333	U1	mꜣ
𓂝	U+1309D	D36	mỉ
𓂟	U+1309F	D38	mỉ
𓈘	U+13218	N36	mỉ
𓏇	U+133C7	W19	mỉ
𓈗	U+13217	N35a	mw
𓅔	U+13154	G18	mm
𓌇	U+13307	T1	mn
𓏠	U+133E0	Y5	mn
𓈘	U+13218	N36	mr
𓉕	U+13255	O5	mr
𓌸	U+13338	U6	mr
𓍋	U+1334B	U23	mr
𓎔	U+13394	V22	mḥ
𓄟	U+1311F	F31	ms
𓂸	U+130B8	D52	mt
𓅐	U+13150	G14	mt
𓌃	U+13303	S43	md
𓂜	U+1309C	D35	nỉ
𓂢	U+130A2	D41	nỉ
𓍇	U+13347	U19	nw
𓏌	U+133CC	W24	nw
𓎟	U+1339F	V30	nb
𓉕	U+13255	O5	nm
𓌰	U+13330	T34	nm
𓌱	U+13301	T35	nm
𓇒	U+131D2	M22a	nn
𓆂	U+13182	H4	nr
𓅘	U+13158	G21	nḥ
𓄓	U+13113	F20	ns
𓐩	U+13429	Aa27	nḏ
𓃭	U+130ED	E23	rw
𓌘	U+13318	T13	rs
𓍁	U+13341	U13	hb
𓇉	U+131C9	M16	ḥꜣ
𓄑	U+13111	F18	ḥw
𓐑	U+13411	Aa5	ḥp
𓈟	U+1321F	N42	ḥm
𓍛	U+1335B	U36	ḥm
𓆰	U+131B0	M2	ḥn
𓌼	U+1333C	U8	ḥn
𓎨	U+133A8	V36	ḥn
𓁷	U+13077	D2	ḥr
𓈐	U+13210	N31	ḥr
𓎿	U+133BF	W14	ḥz
𓌉	U+13309	T3	ḥḏ
𓌋	U+1330B	T4	ḥḏ
𓆩	U+131A9	L6	ḫꜣ
𓆼	U+131BC	M12	ḫꜣ
𓈍	U+1320D	N28	ḫꜥ
𓂤	U+130A4	D43	ḫw
𓋉	U+132C9	R22	ḫm
𓆱	U+131B1	M3	ḫt
𓆞	U+1319E	K4	ẖꜣ
𓂙	U+13099	D33	ẖn
𓄚	U+1311A	F26	ẖn
𓌨	U+13328	T28	ẖr
𓅭	U+1316D	G39	zꜣ
𓎂	U+13382	V16	zꜣ
𓎃	U+13383	V17	zꜣ
𓊗	U+13297	O50	zp
𓐟	U+1341F	Aa17	sꜣ
𓐠	U+13420	Aa18	sꜣ
𓇓	U+131D3	M23	sw
𓌢	U+13322	T22	sn
𓎝	U+1339D	V29	sk
𓄝	U+1311D	F29	st
𓊨	U+132A8	Q1	st
𓋫	U+132EB	S22	sṯ
𓏴	U+133F4	Z9	sḏ
𓆆	U+13186	H7	šꜣ
𓆷	U+131B7	M8	šꜣ
𓆄	U+13184	H6	šw
𓈝	U+1321D	N40	šm
𓍢	U+13362	V1	šn
𓍲	U+13372	V7	šn
𓍱	U+13371	V6	šs
𓄞	U+1311E	F30	šd
𓐖	U+13416	Aa8	qn
𓌟	U+1331F	T19	qs
𓐪	U+1342A	Aa28	qd
𓂓	U+13093	D28	kꜣ
𓊶	U+132B6	R5	kp
𓆎	U+1318E	I6	km
𓅬	U+1316C	G38	gb
𓅠	U+13160	G28	gm
𓐛	U+1341B	Aa13	gs
𓐞	U+1341E	Aa16	gs
𓇾	U+131FE	N16	tꜣ
𓇿	U+131FF	N17	tꜣ
𓍔	U+13354	U30	tꜣ
𓍘	U+13358	U33	tỉ
𓁶	U+13076	D1	tp
𓌐	U+13310	T8	tp
𓍃	U+13343	U15	tm
𓆵	U+131B5	M6	tr
𓅷	U+13177	G47	ṯꜣ
𓋭	U+132ED	S24	ṯz
𓂞	U+1309E	D37	dỉ
𓍑	U+13351	U28	ḏꜣ
𓍒	U+13352	U29	ḏꜣ
𓏙	U+133D9	X8	ḏỉ
𓈋	U+1320B	N26	ḏw
𓅙	U+13159	G22	ḏb
𓇥	U+131E5	M36	ḏr
𓊽	U+132BD	R11	ḏd
𓆕	U+13195	I11	ḏḏ

== See also ==
- Transliteration of ancient Egyptian
- Egyptian uniliteral signs
- Egyptian triliteral signs
- List of hieroglyphs
