= Was-sceptre =

Ancient Egyptian religious symbol

A was-sceptre

wAs
w3s
in hieroglyphs

The was (Egyptian wꜣs "power, dominion") or uas sceptre is a symbol that appeared often in relics, art, and hieroglyphs associated with the ancient Egyptian religion. It appears as a stylized animal head at the top of a long, straight staff with a forked end.

Was sceptres were used as symbols of power or dominion, and were associated with ancient Egyptian deities such as Set or Anubis as well as with the pharaoh. 'Was sceptres also represent the Set animal or Khnum. In later use, it was a symbol of control over the force of chaos that Set represented.

In a funerary context, the was sceptre was responsible for the well-being of the deceased and was thus sometimes included in the tomb-equipment or in the decoration of the tomb or coffin. The sceptre is also considered an amulet. The Egyptians perceived the sky as being supported on four pillars, which could have the shape of the was. This sceptre was also the symbol of the fourth Upper Egyptian nome, the nome of Thebes (called wꜣst in Egyptian).

Was sceptres were depicted as being carried by gods, pharaohs, and priests. They commonly occur in paintings, drawings, and carvings of gods, and often parallel with emblems such as the ankh and the djed-pillar. Remnants of physical was sceptres have been found. They are constructed of faience or wood, where the head and forked tail of the Set animal are visible. The earliest examples date to the First Dynasty.

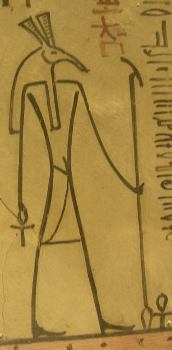
A was sceptre carried by the god Set, in the tomb of Thutmose III

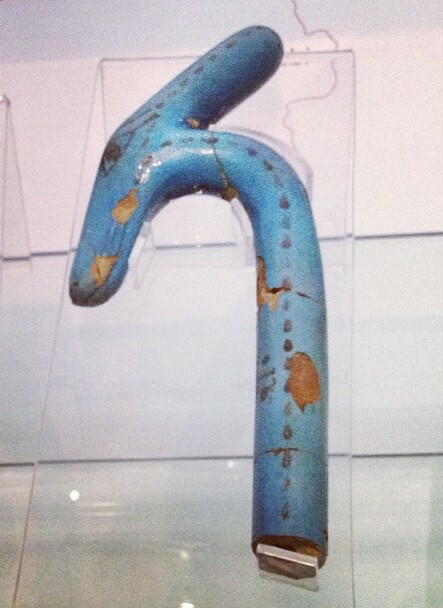
Head of a physical was sceptre made from faience

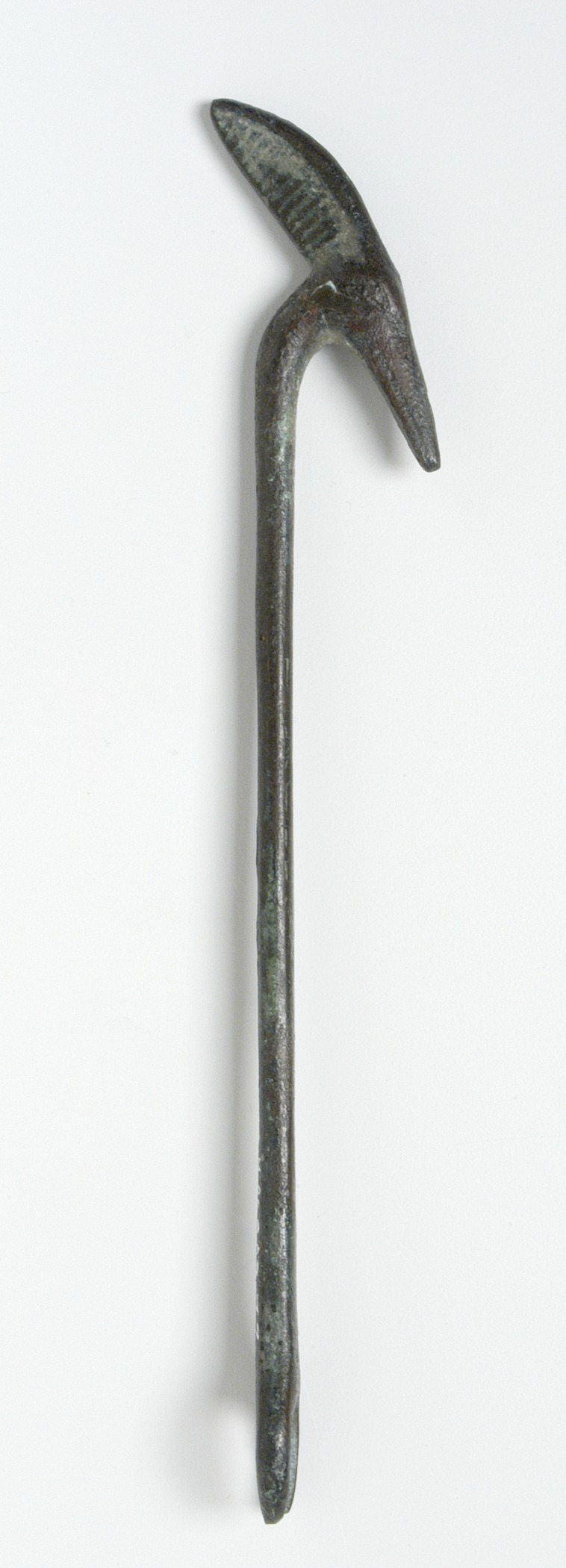
Was-shaped amulet with animal head and forked tail

The Was (wꜣs) is the Egyptian hieroglyph character representing power.

== See also ==
- Sekhem scepter
