= List of portraiture offerings with Ancient Egyptian hieroglyphs =

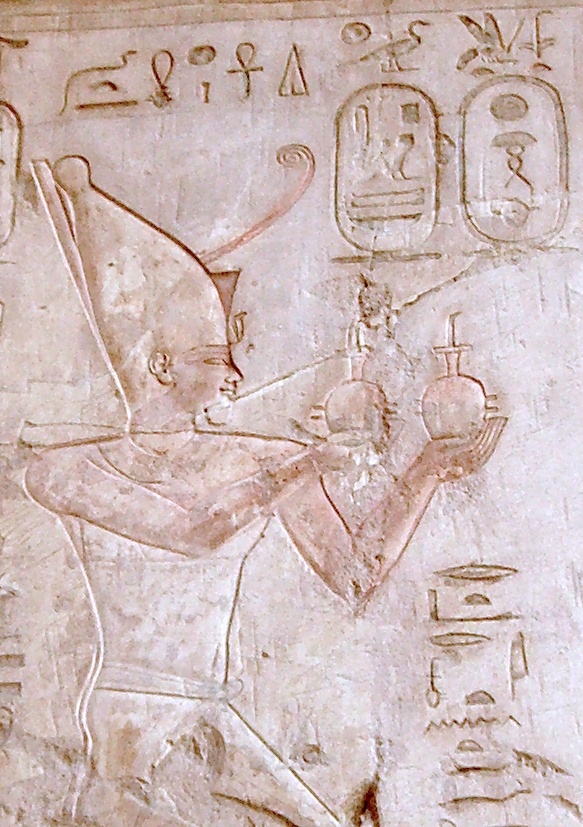
Milk vessel determinative, (lower right column); also the actual Milk vessels being offered

This is a list of portraiture offerings with Ancient Egyptian hieroglyphs.

The two major uses of Egyptian language hieroglyph offerings are the wall reliefs, and statuary; minor uses might be thought of as minor statues, charms, or amulets. Many of the sphinx statues are shown with an offering vessel.

== List of common offering vessels ==
This list is incomplete; you can help by expanding it.

The common nu pot W24 is the iconography where all offering pots are based. A simple one based on it is the incense censor pot, with a flame of smoke,.

Many other types of offerings, represented by Egyptian language hieroglyphs are made, by the pharaoh himself/herself in portraiture, or by the gods that are portrayed with offerings.

=== Incense pot ===
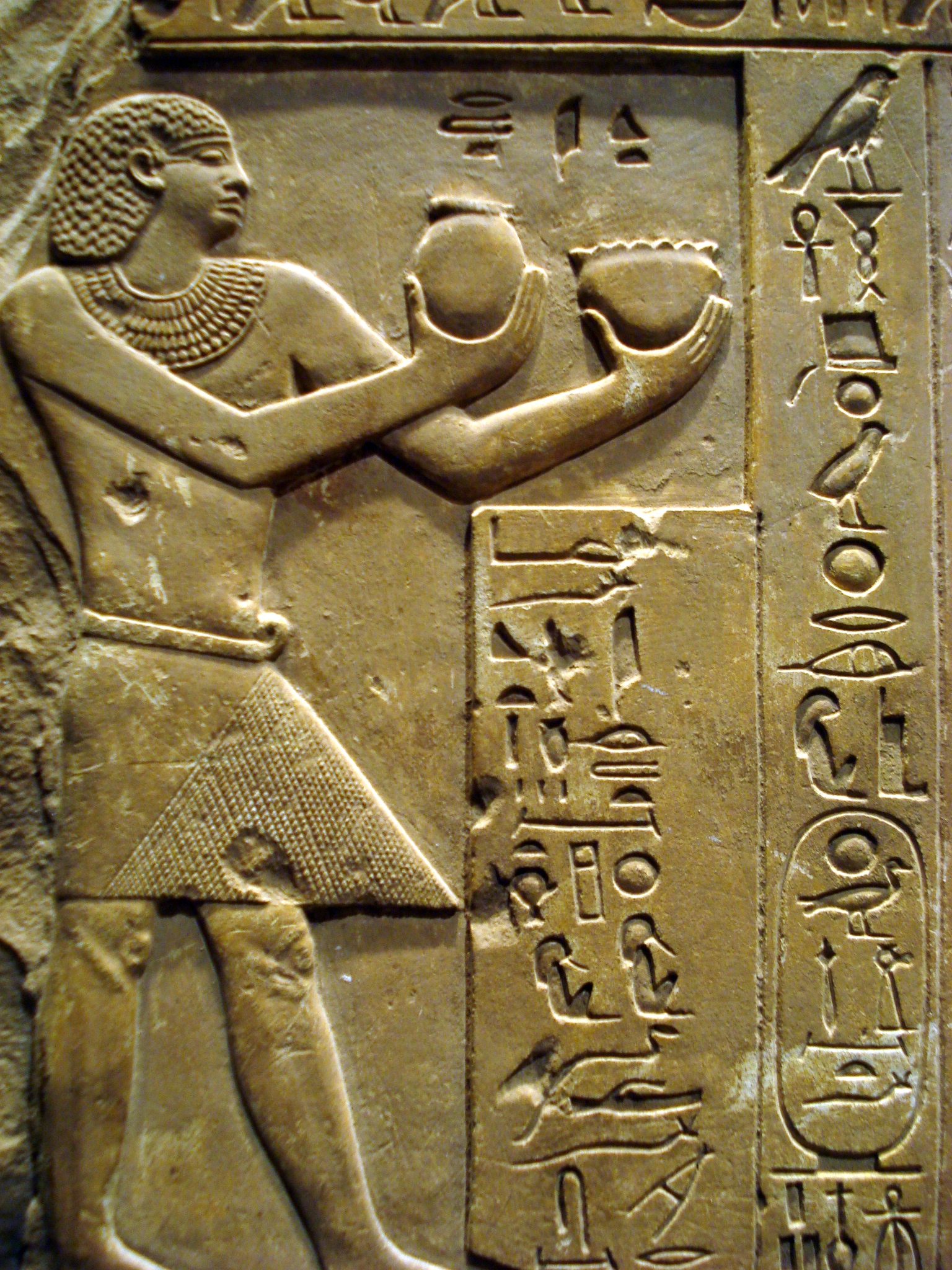
Nw pot, and "decorated-fringe" pot

Items from the Gardiner's Sign List of Temple Furniture and Sacred Emblems, (section R).

- Censer pot, with vapors-R7.
- Censer arm-R5.
- Offering of an altar-R2.

=== Liquid vessels ===
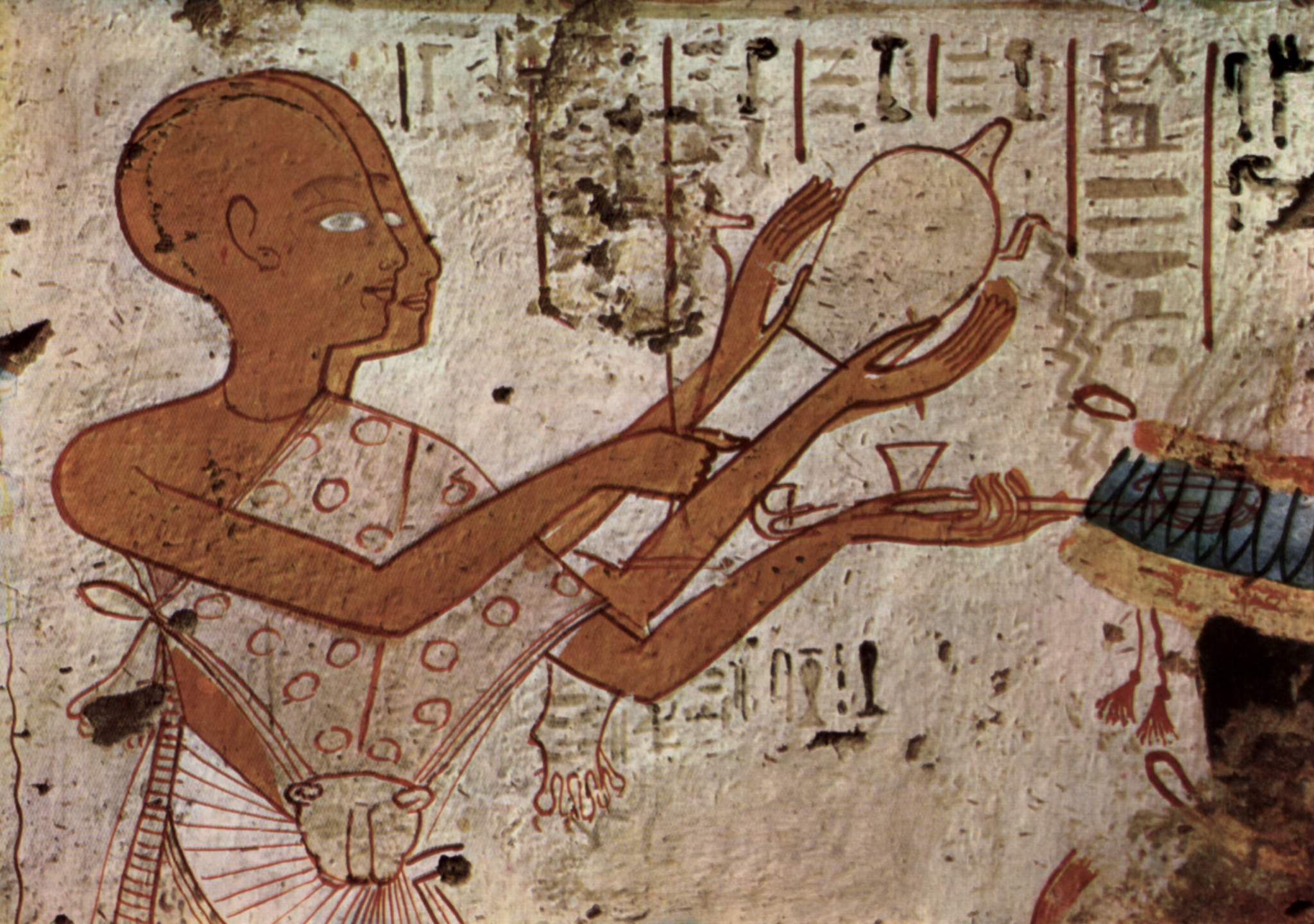
Liquids being offered from vessel

Liquid vessels.

- Vessel with liquid stream-W15.
- Common nu vessel-W24.

== Other miscellaneous offerings ==
- Bread-X3. (see here: )
- Bread-cone-X8. (see here: , )
- Field of Dreams-M20.
- Joint of meat-F44. (see here:
- Life symbol: Ankh-S34. (see here:
- Ointment jar-(Alabastron)-W1 W2. (see here:
- Recumbent sphinx, lion-E23. (see here: )
- Ripple of Water-N35. (see here: )

== Gallery of statuary with offering vessels ==
=== Monumental type ===
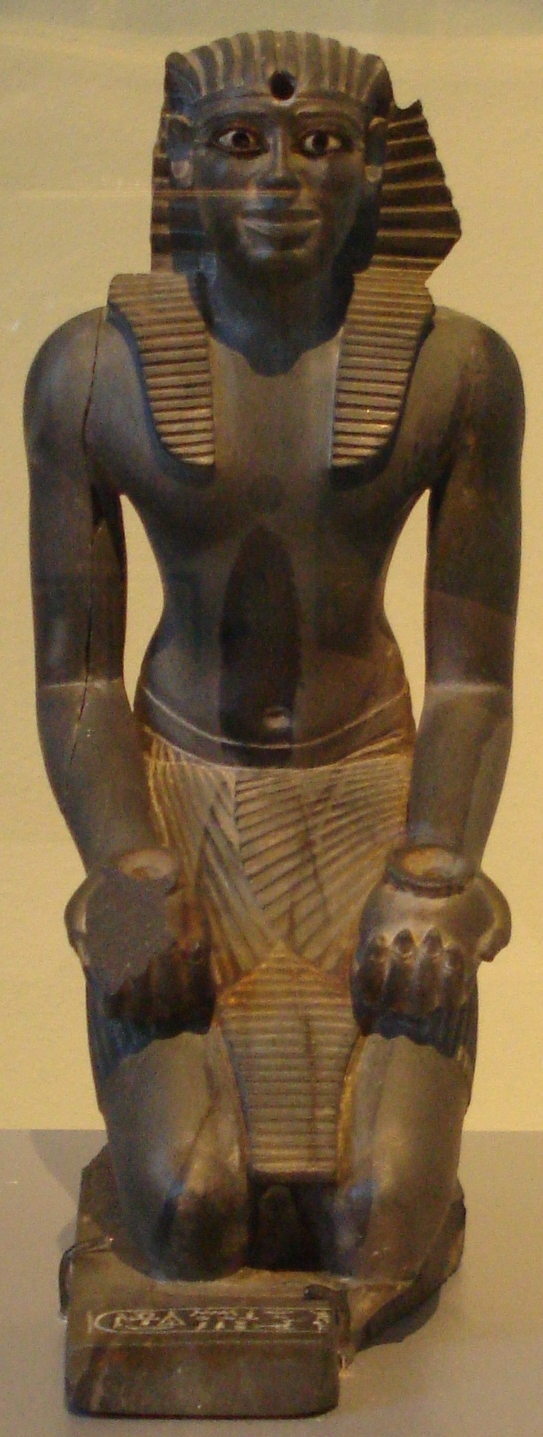
6th Dynasty, 24th-23rd century BC

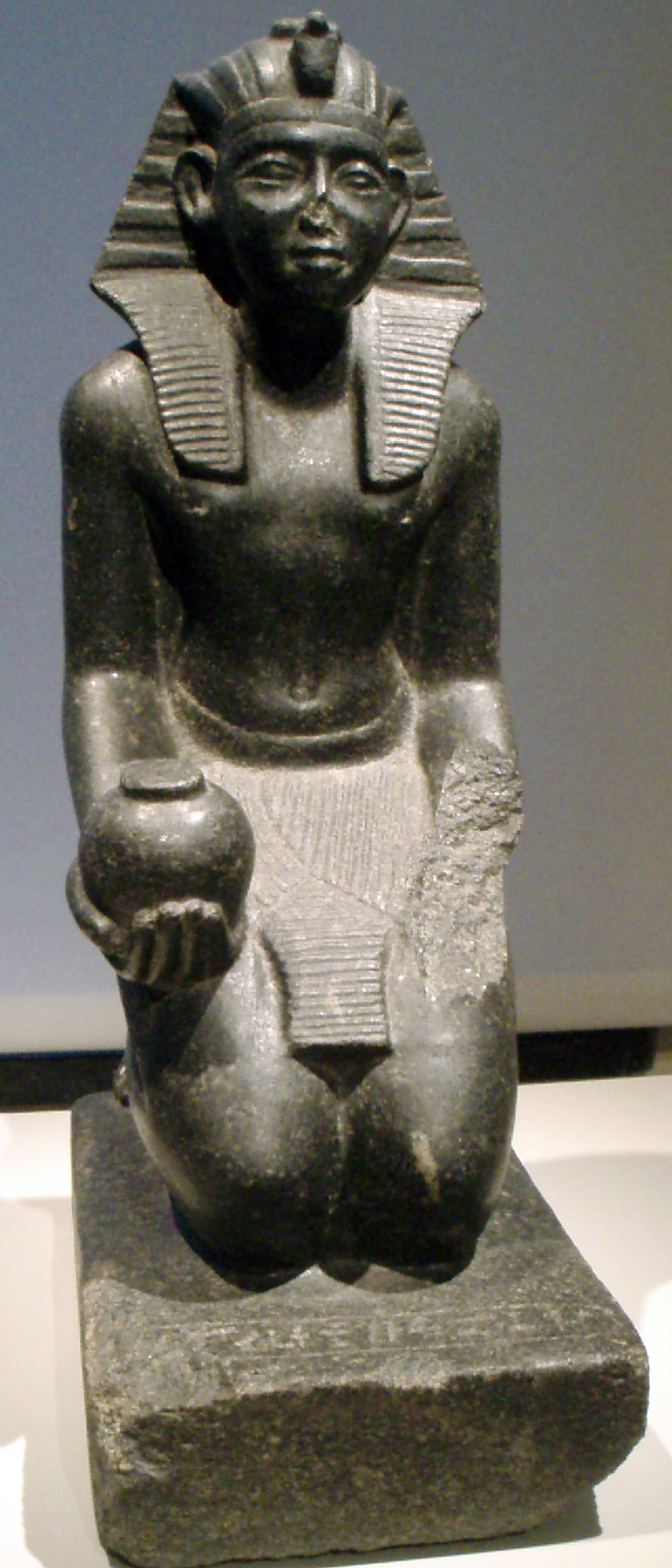
19th century BC

=== Minor-sized statuary ===
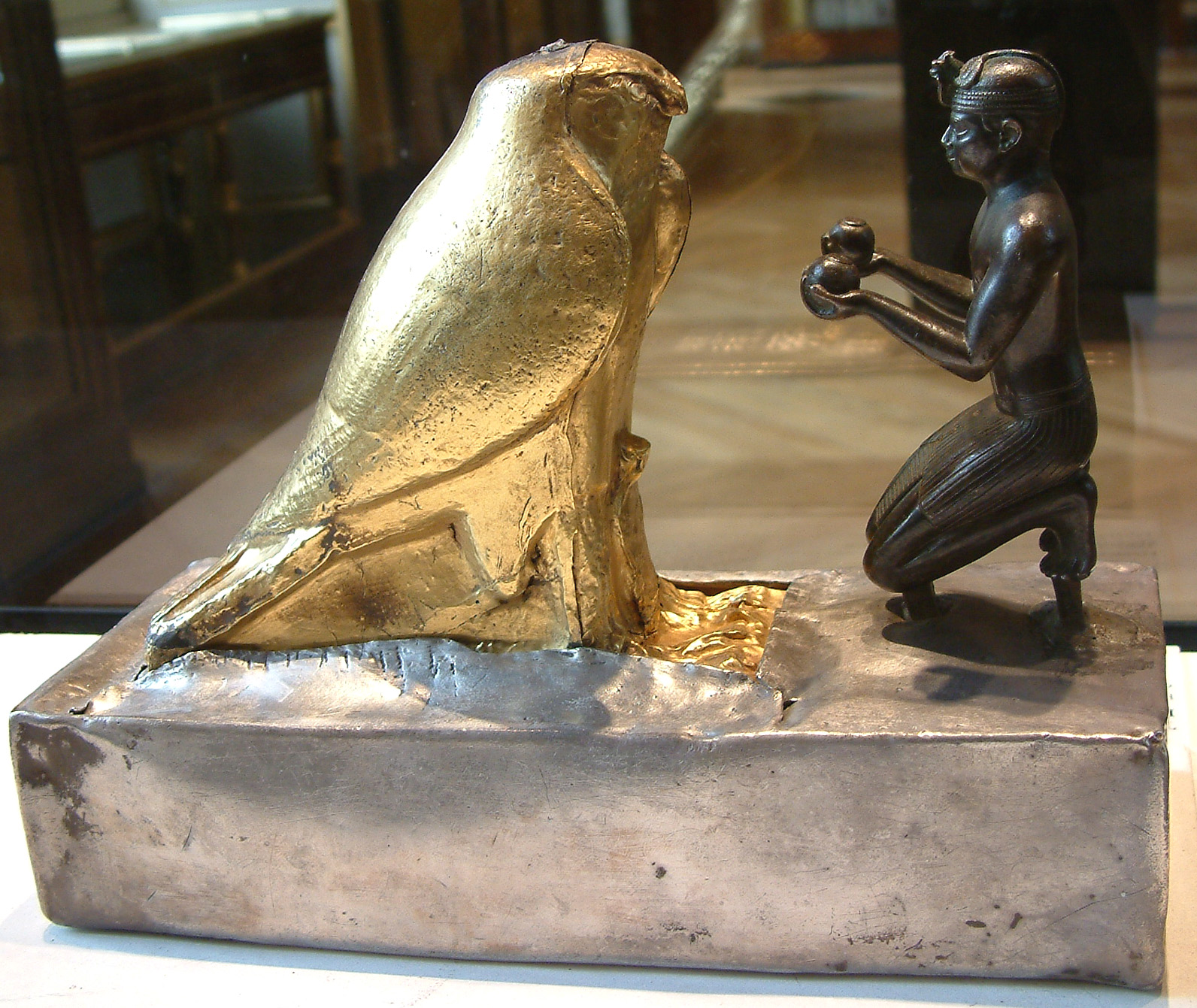
Pharaoh Taharqa and Horus-Falcon, 25th Dynasty, 7th century BC

== See also ==
- List of Egyptian hieroglyphs by common name: A-L
- List of Egyptian hieroglyphs by common name: M-Z
- List of Egyptian hieroglyphs by alphabetization
