= Incense burner: arm (hieroglyph) =

Egyptian hieroglyph

R5
Incense censer
(horizontal, as ~arm)
in hieroglyphs

The ancient Egyptian Incense burner: arm is a horizontal hieroglyph representing various types of horizontal tools used to offer, and burn incense. In tomb scenes, it is sometimes depicted with a little cup-shaped box attached for keeping incense on the top surface; the person making the offering is occasionally seen holding an incense grain-pellet with lines of incense, or linked grains-in-a-line, which are equivalent to drifting smoke.

Incense was used from the beginning dynasties of Ancient Egypt.

The horizontal incense burner is a determinative in Egyptian language k3p, for "incense, to make smoke". The phonetic value of the hieroglyph is kp.

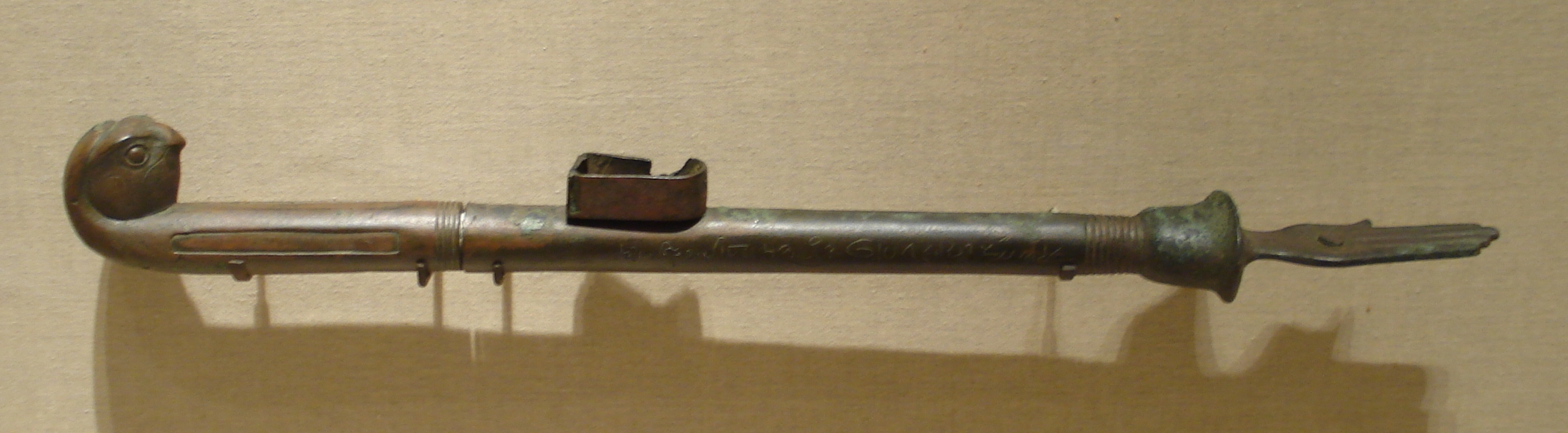
Egyptian Third Intermediate Period bronze incense burner

== Incense burner: pot ==
R7
Common
Incense Burner: Pot
in hieroglyphs

The other common type of hieroglyph for the burning of incense, is a small pot, with a flame, flickering from the top surface, "Incense burner: pot with smoke". The censer pot has one major usage in front of the feet of the "Soul" bird, the Ibis, R7 G25 but is also replaced in rare instances with a meteor hieroglyph, D12 G25, (not Gardiner listed).
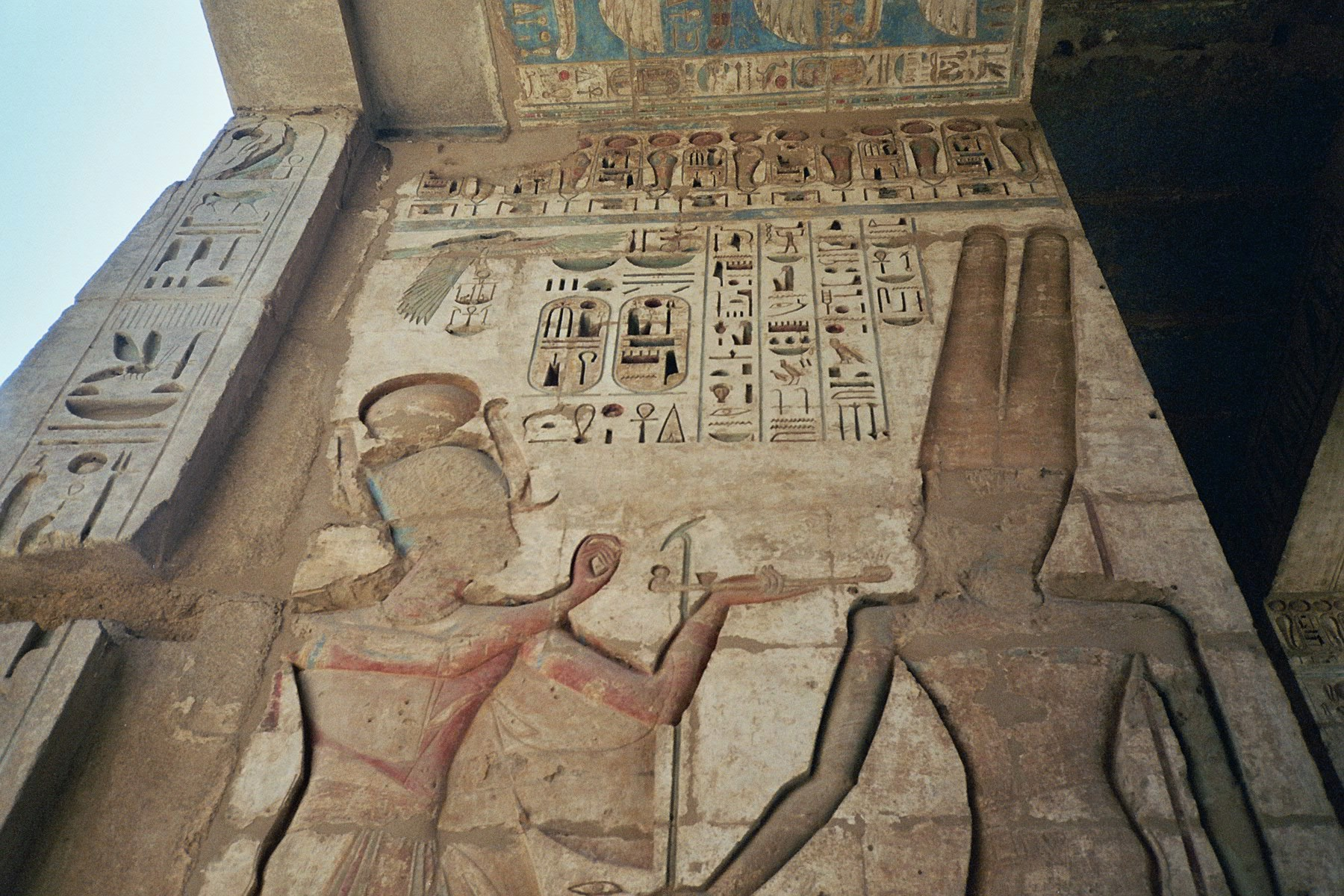
Medinet Habu

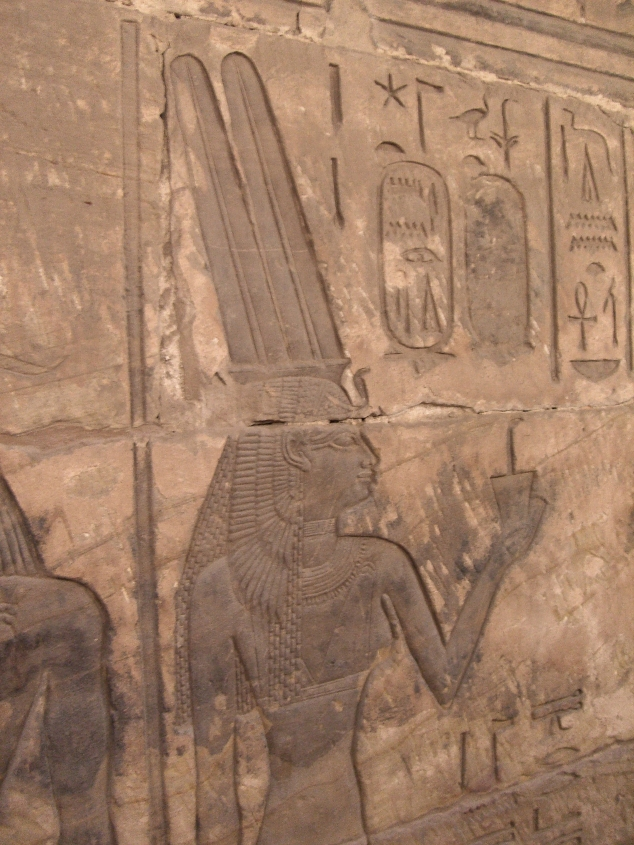
Amenirdis I

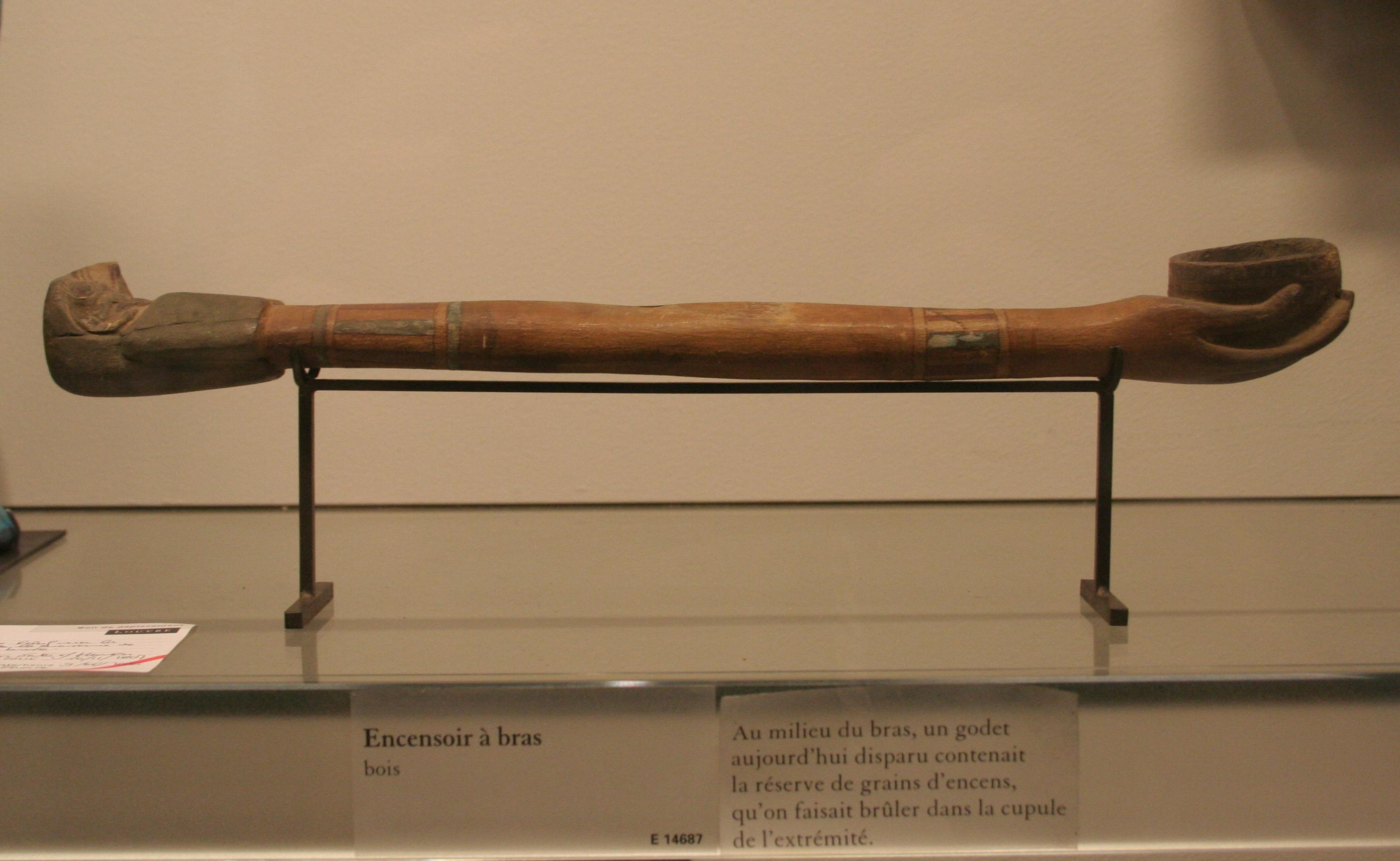
Censer arm artefact

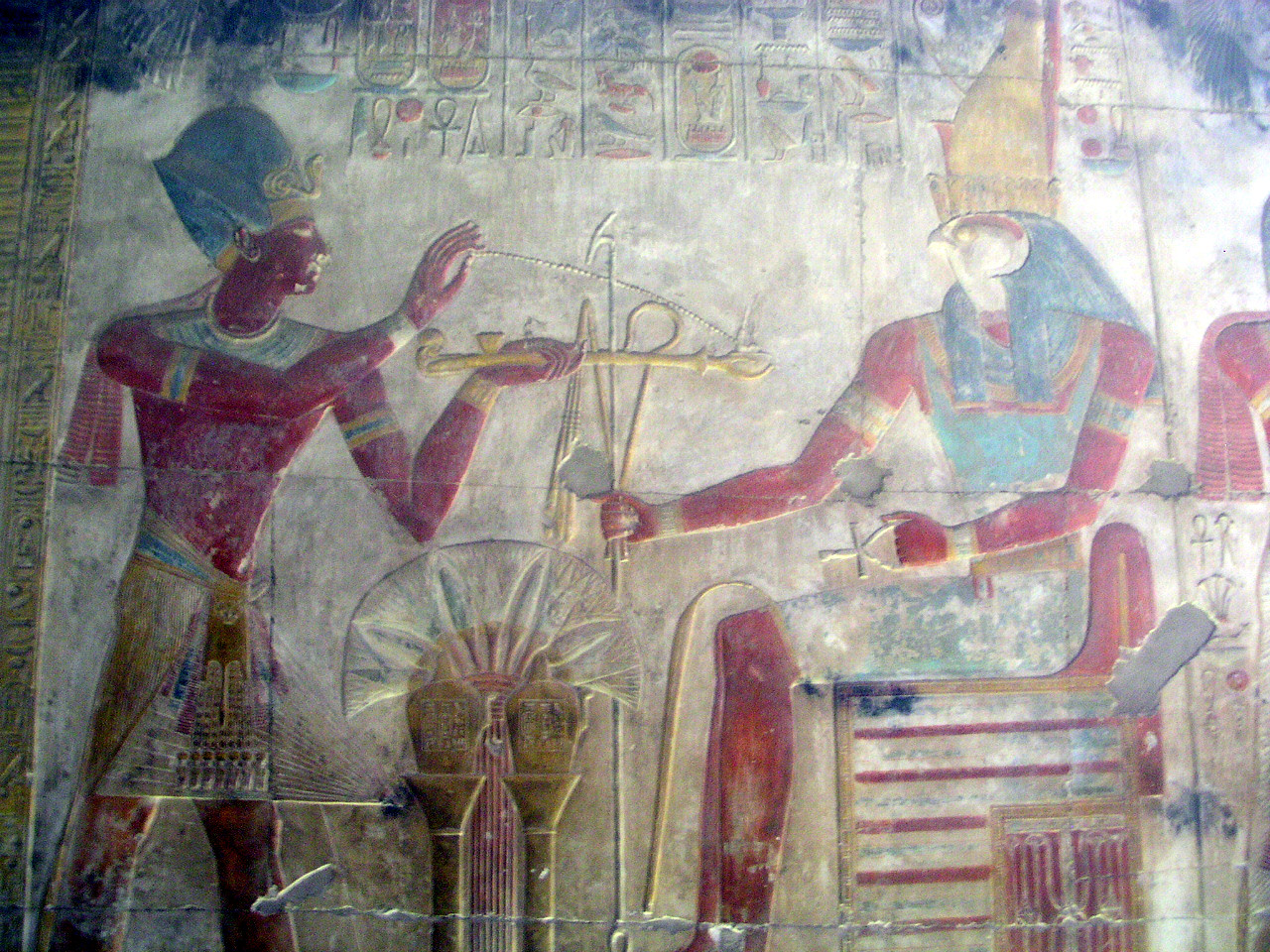
Incense-smoke with "grains"-of-incense

== See also ==
- Incense burner: pot (hieroglyph)
- Gardiner's Sign List#R. Temple Furniture and Sacred Emblems
- List of Egyptian hieroglyphs
