= Matteo Tafuri =

Italian alchemist and astrologer

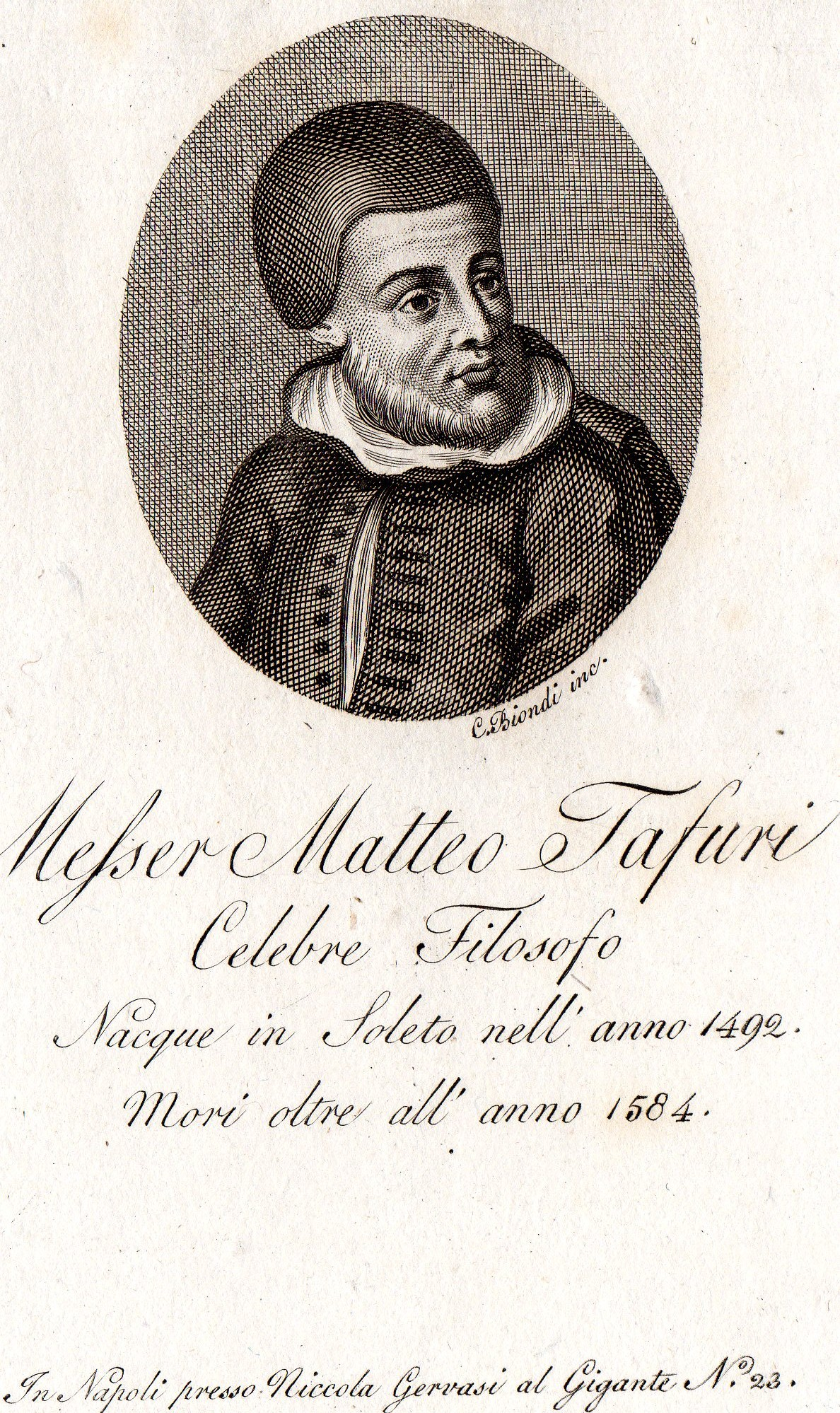
- Born: 8 August 1492; Soleto
- Died: 13 June 1582 (aged 89); Soleto
- Citizenship: Italian
- Scientific career
- Fields: Astrology, Philosophy, Medicine

Matteo Tafuri (8 August 1492 – 13 June 1582) was an Italian philosopher, astrologer and physician, who was famed for his divination, but also was reputed to be a magician who practised demonic arts.

== Biography ==
Matteo Tafuri was born in Soleto, a small village in the south of Apulia, on 8 August 1492. In his early years, he studied the Hellenic culture through the teachings of Sergio Stiso, a famous Hellenistic from Zollino, and later he devoted himself to philosophy and medicine in Naples. In 1525 in Padua he met Zimaria, an Aristotelian disciple of Pietro Pomponazzi and in Venice he proved his ability of divination to King Francis I of France.

In the same year, he went to England, where he met Thomas More and the Archbishop Thomas Wolsey, but there he was inquired for heresy. Then he studied philosophy and medicine in Paris at the Sorbonne, he attended the University of Salamanca in Spain and travelled through Africa, Poland and Greece. Finally, he came back to his native village, Soleto, where in 1569, he was accused of witchcraft and satanic powers by the Inquisition, was imprisoned for 15 months, and later acquitted. In 1571, he received a visit from Juan of Austria, a commander of the fleet of the Holy League that won the Battle of Lepanto, who wanted to meet the "old Matteo".

He lived his last years in poverty in Soleto, feared and disliked by the people, receiving a pension from the Archbishop of Capua and a support from the “Universitas” of Soleto, which wanted to reward him for his contribution to the education of the citizens. He died in Soleto on 13 June 1582.

== Reputation ==
Matteo Tafuri was one of the most eminent personalities of Apulia in the 16th century, and he remained in the popular culture as a sorcerer and a practitioner of the "demonic religion". The magic of Tafuri must be understood as knowledge of natural mysteries through astrology, alchemy and medicine, which could break the "spell of evil." He was defended by Father Stanislao, who said, in his "critical propositio", that Tafuri never practised the demonic magic and that many powerful and wise men came from everywhere attracted by his wide culture.

== Works and culture ==
Matteo Tafuri wrote many works but they were lost by his relatives in the course of the years, and what survives, except for the Pronostico, is only a list of titles. He was known as a great astrologer and an expert in physiognomy. According to his contemporaries, he based himself on somatic characteristics to know the future events of a person. He was also an expert in herbs and medical plants and studied the properties of mandrake to cause apparent death, he studied anaesthetic substances and methods of inducing sleep (contained in the "somnibus" and "de insomniandi artificial") and he has likely used the "treacle", an alchemical medicine, to cure sick people when the plague spread throughout the area of Soleto in 1571.

In his work Pronostico, dated 1571, Tafuri suggested to the Marquis Giovanni Del Tufo to stick on the shoulders of his sick child some pieces of paper with a psalm of death written on, in order to drive away bad luck and evil forces, a typically ecclesiastical remedy.

== Bibliography ==
- Marco Lanera, Michele Paone, Momenti e figure di storia pugliese, Congedo editore, Galatina 1981, vol. I, ISBN 9788877861566, pp. 255–265
- Luigi Manni, La guglia, l'astrologo, la macàra, C.R.S.E.O. LE/42, Galatina 2004
