= Soleto Map =

Ancient map engraved onto a pottery fragment

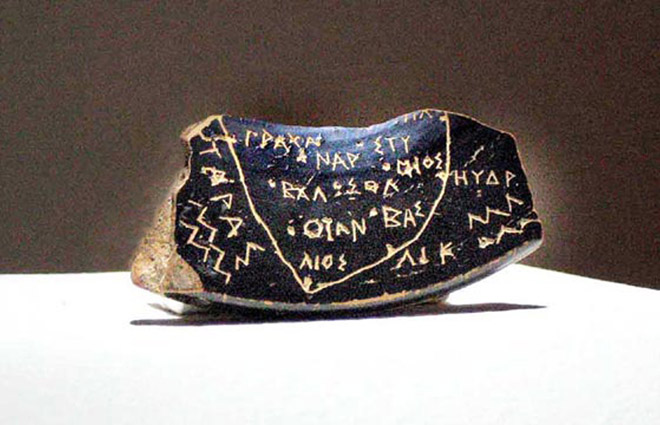
Soleto Map on display at Taranto's National Archaeological Museum

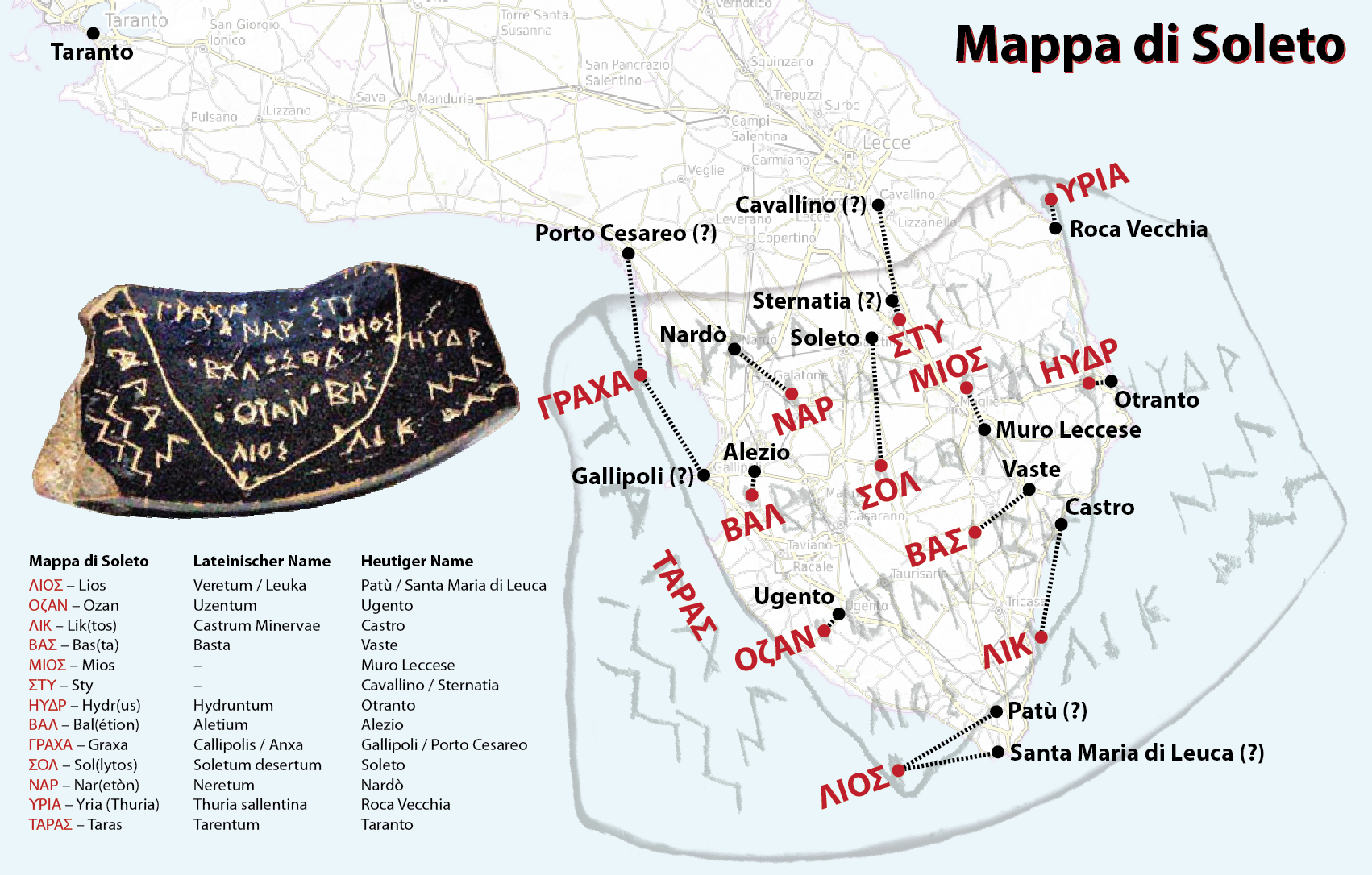
Localization of the sites shown on the Soleto Map

The Soleto Map is possibly an ancient map depicting the southeastern part of the Salento peninsula, scratched onto a fragment of a terracotta pot (an ostrakon). While the ostrakon itself is undoubtedly ancient, serious doubts have been raised about the age of the map.

== Background ==
The map was discovered in Soleto (southern Italy) by Belgian archaeologist Thierry van Compernolle of Montpellier University on August 21, 2003. Scratched into a pottery fragment that dates back to 500 BC, the map includes letters derived from a Greek script. The languages expressed on the map are both Greek and Messapian. Moreover, the Soleto Map describes the city of Taranto (called Taras), as well as other cities of Salento such as Soleto, Leuca, Ugento, and Otranto. The map went on public display in 2005 at the Archaeological National Museum of Taranto.

== Controversy ==
There have been strong arguments that the map is a forgery. In the January/February 2006 issue of the Dutch newspaper Geschiedenis Magazine, Dutch archaeologist Douwe Yntema of Vrije University in Amsterdam found the authenticity of the map questionable. According to Yntema, the map looks like a school atlas with placenames engraved and north at the top. Moreover, the Soleto Map shows the towns as points rather than house symbols found on other ancient maps. Finally, the engravings follow the precise borders of the ostrakon itself, which suggests that the map was made after the pot was broken.
