= Satirical ostraca =

Broken Pottery Featuring Role Reversals

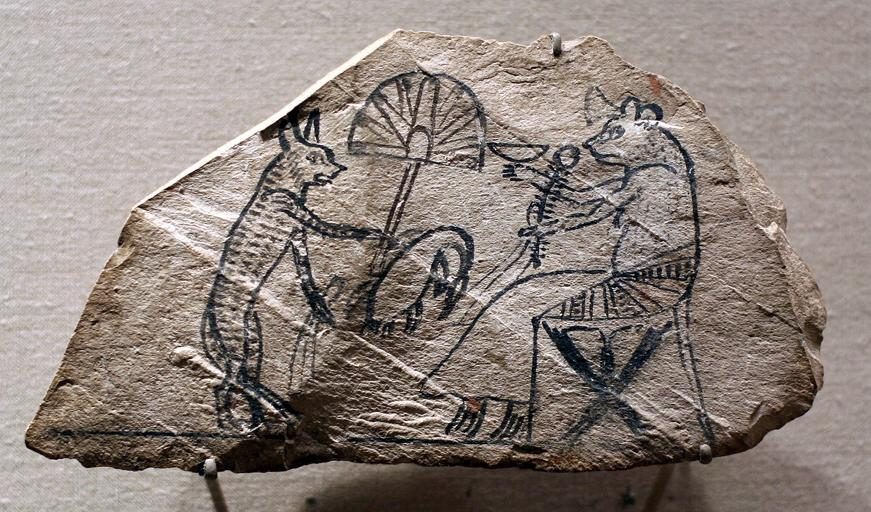
"Cat Waiting on a Mouse" is Egyptian artwork about 3000 years old that depicts a servant cat presenting offerings in front of a high class rodent.

Satirical ostraca are a category of ostraca (singular: an ostracon) that represent the real world in unrealistic, impossible situations–a satire. The common example portrayed which helped create this categorization, are animals which take reversed roles, for example a vertically–walking cat, with ducks on the end of leashes. The same role reversals can be seen on satirical papyri. This concept is a prevalent feature in absurdist literature, such as in the works of Mikhail Bulgakov.

The scenes depicted in these ostraca were meant to emulate the common artistic motifs of the time, such as those scene on tomb walls and even the ceramics the pieces broke from. However, ostraca themselves were used the name way notepads are in the modern day (used for writing basic lists and reminders before being discarded), and many satirical ostraca have been found amount these mundane pieces in dumps. For this reason, historians and archeologists often consider them to be have lower artistic value than commissioned works.

== Gallery ==
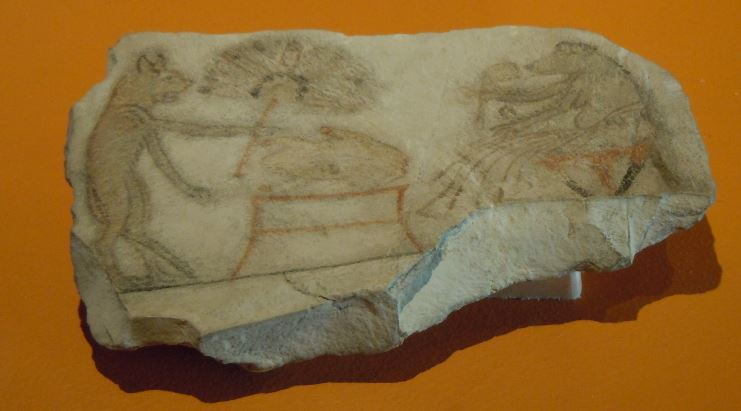
Ostracon showing a mouse and a cat at a dining table

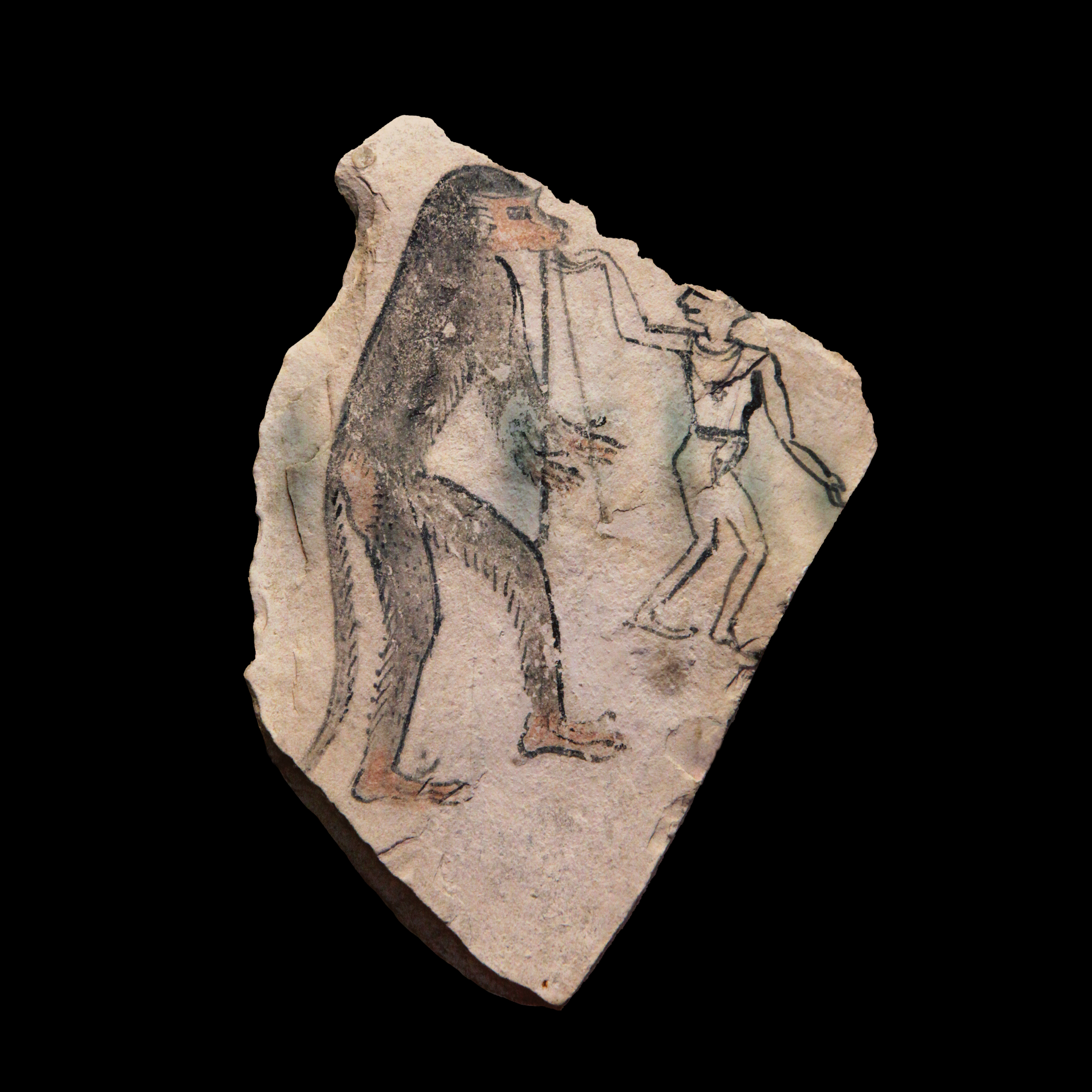
"Humouristic Ostracon" discovered outside of Deir el-Medina, 1250 bc, limestone, housed in Department of Egyptian Antiquities of the Louvre

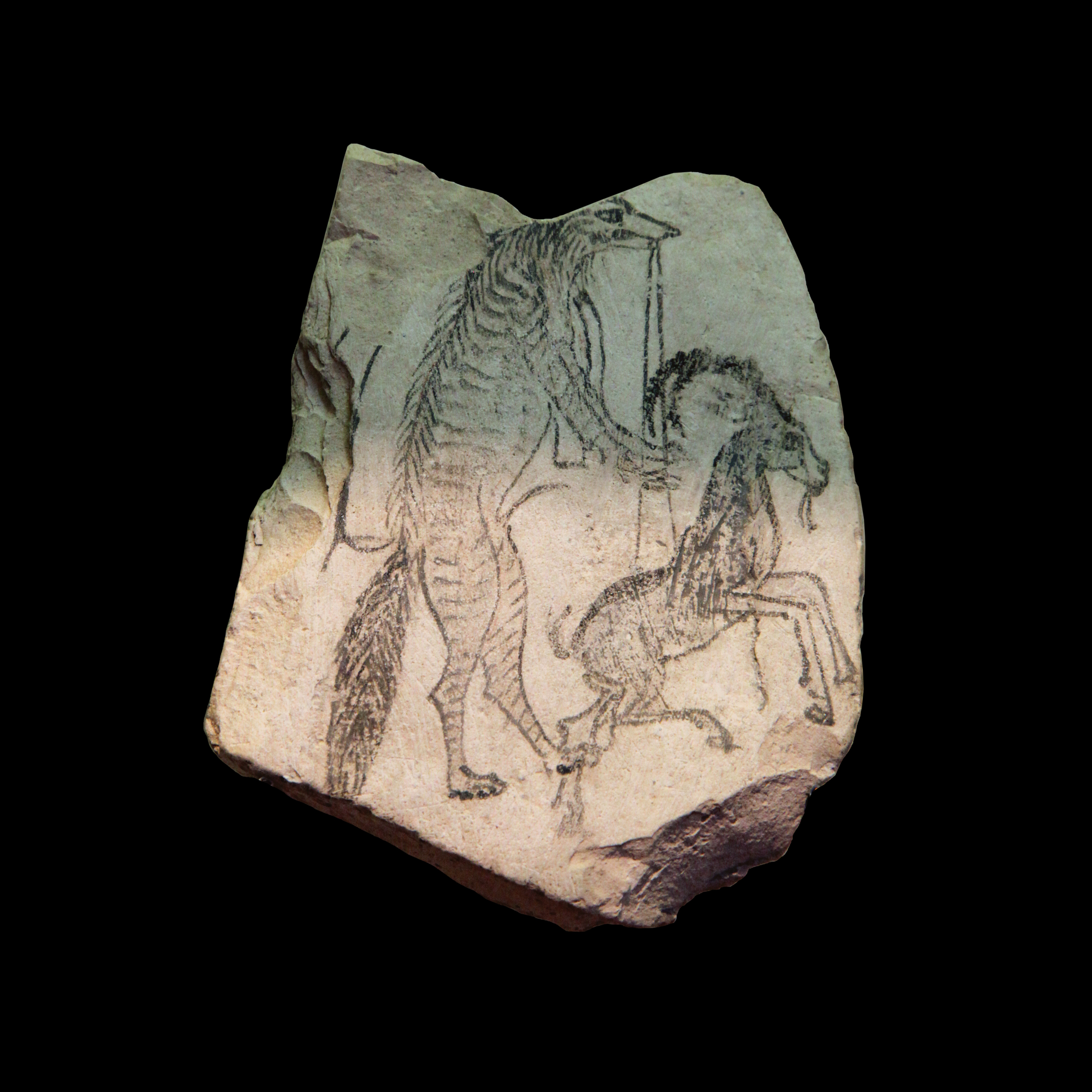
"Humouristic Ostracon" (Possibly a Jackal with a pet Oryx) discovered outside of Deir el-Medina, 1250 bc, limestone, housed in Department of Egyptian Antiquities of the Louvre
