= Incense burner: pot (hieroglyph) =

Egyptian hieroglyph

R7
Common
Incense Burner: Pot
(with 'incense flame')
in hieroglyphs

R5
Incense censer
(horizontal, as ~arm)
in hieroglyphs

The ancient Egyptian Censer pot, (the Incense burner: pot) is most commonly seen in Ancient Egyptian iconography as an offering, held in hand by the offering person or god. Many pots are offered in hands, or a single hand with offerings of oils, a liquid-(water), or other item in the pot.

An alternative, a censer pot is shown with a burning flame, or a flickering cone of smoke above; the censer pot is trapezoidal in shape often, and also often with curved-inward sides, (a flared-out flat top).

The other common form of a censer in Ancient Egypt, as an offering, is a horizontal 'arm with upraised palm', with the palm being the incense burning area.

== Incense pot with flame hieroglyph ==
As a hieroglyph, the censer pot hieroglyph is more common in texts.

The other common type of hieroglyph for the burning of incense, is the incense burner: arm (hieroglyph). In later periods of Ancient Egypt it was often made of bronze. In portrayed scenes with the arm, the offerer, most often the pharaoh offering to the god, is shown adding incense pellets from a small storage box at the base of the arm.

== Incense ==
Incense has a long history in Ancient Egypt, as well as the Mesopotamian cultures. Iconographic examples, and the literature of offerings performed, attest to the rituals of both cultures and a cultural evolution of their usages.

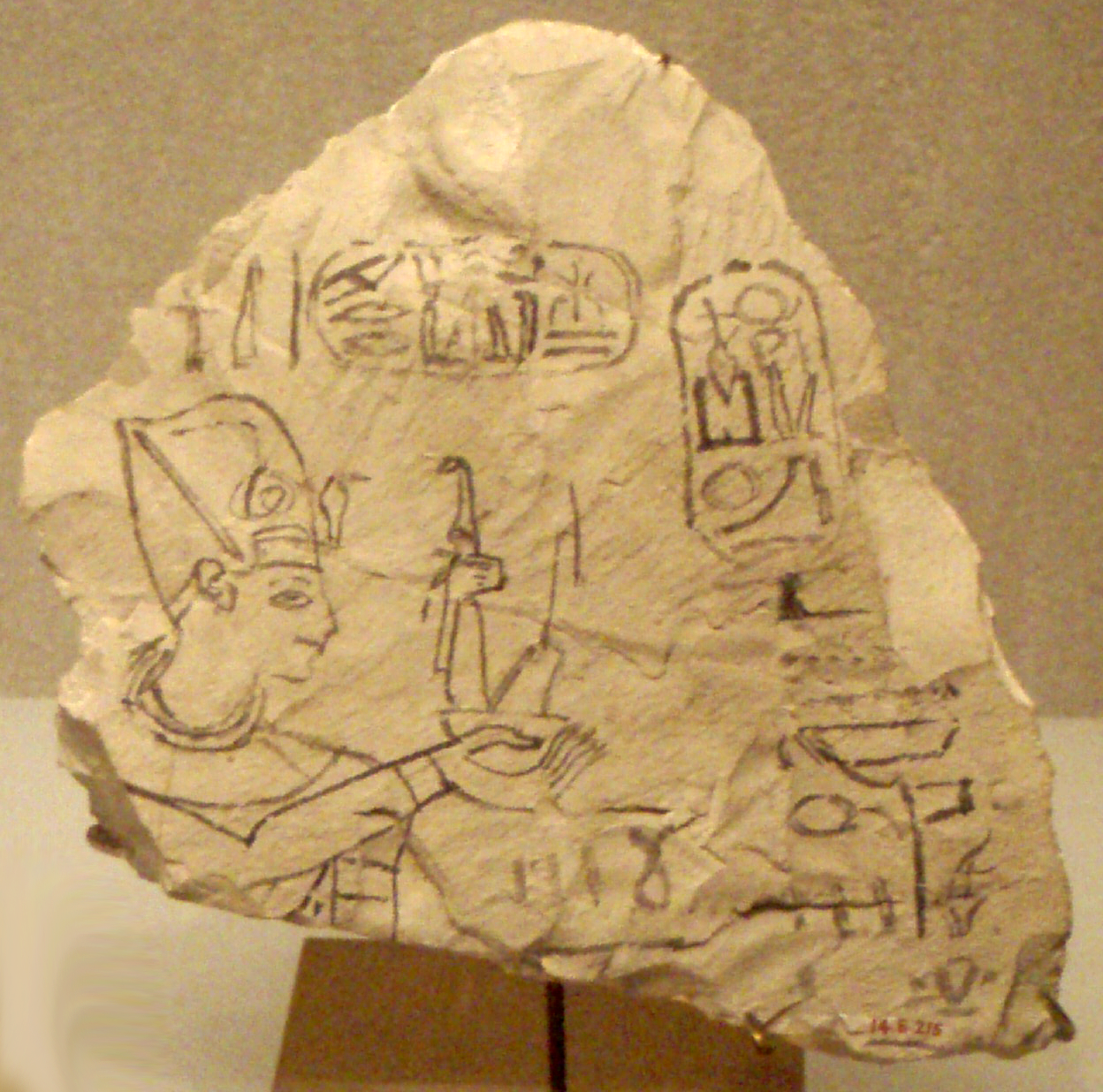
Limestone ostracon showing the incense pot with flame below the "god" hieroglyph-(a 'flag standard').

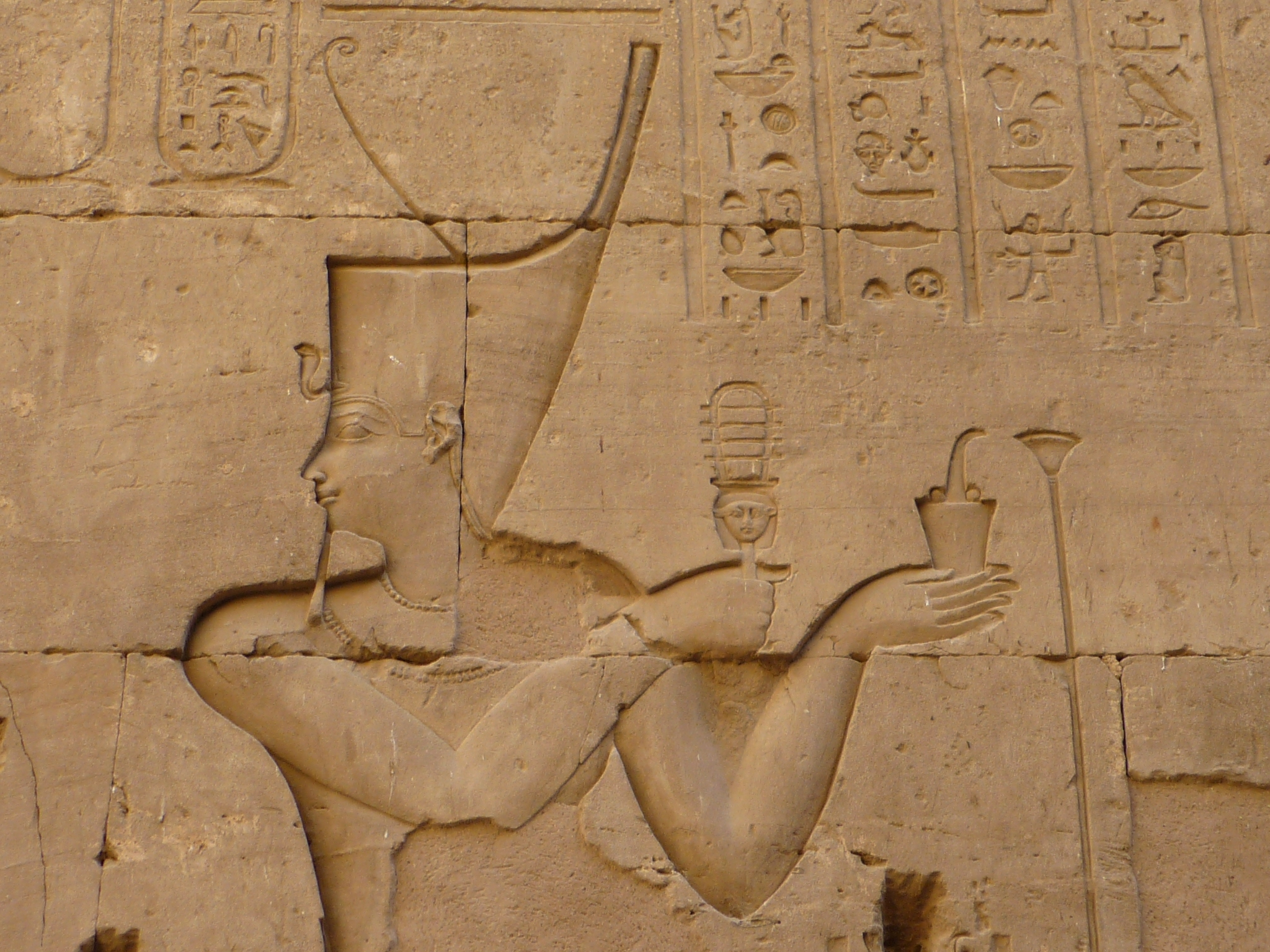
Edfu Temple

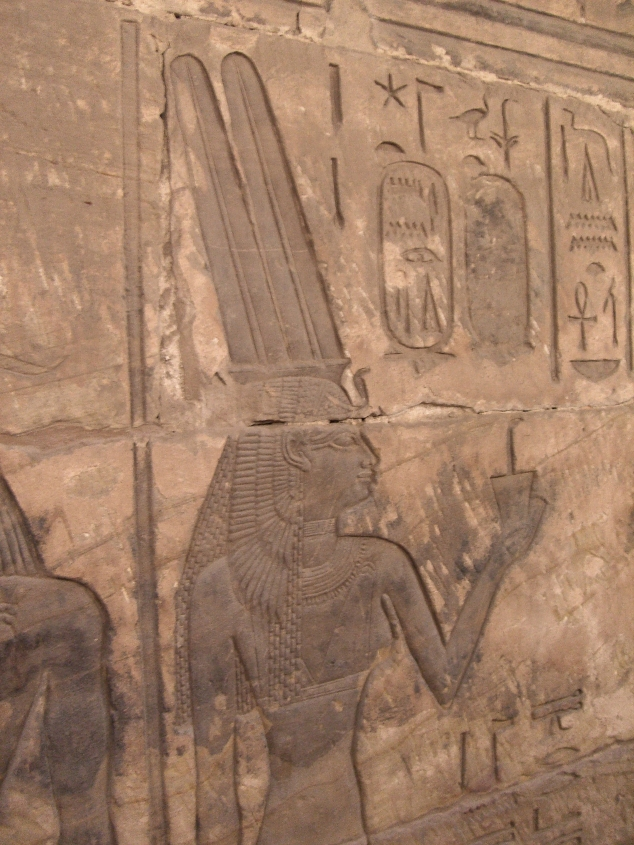
Amenirdis I

== See also ==
- Incense burner: arm (hieroglyph)
- Gardiner's Sign List#R. Temple Furniture and Sacred Emblems
- List of Egyptian hieroglyphs
