= Ostracon =

Broken piece of pottery with inscription

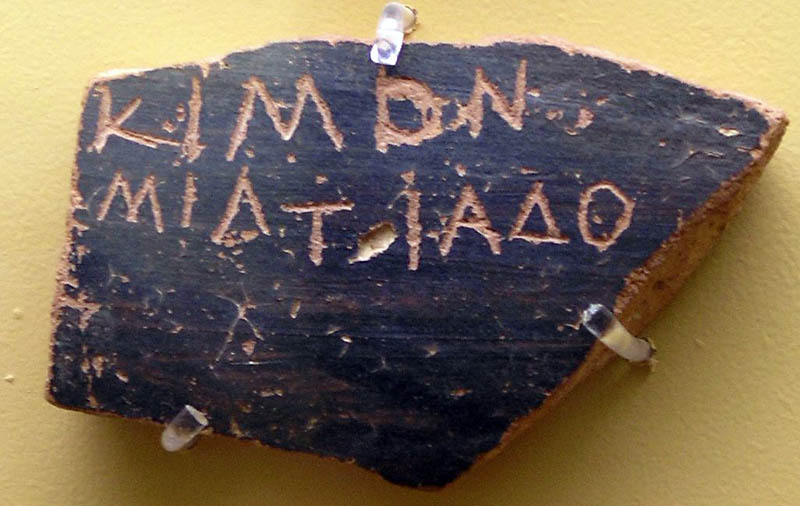
Ostrakon inscribed with "Kimon [son] of Miltiades", for Cimon, an Athenian statesman.

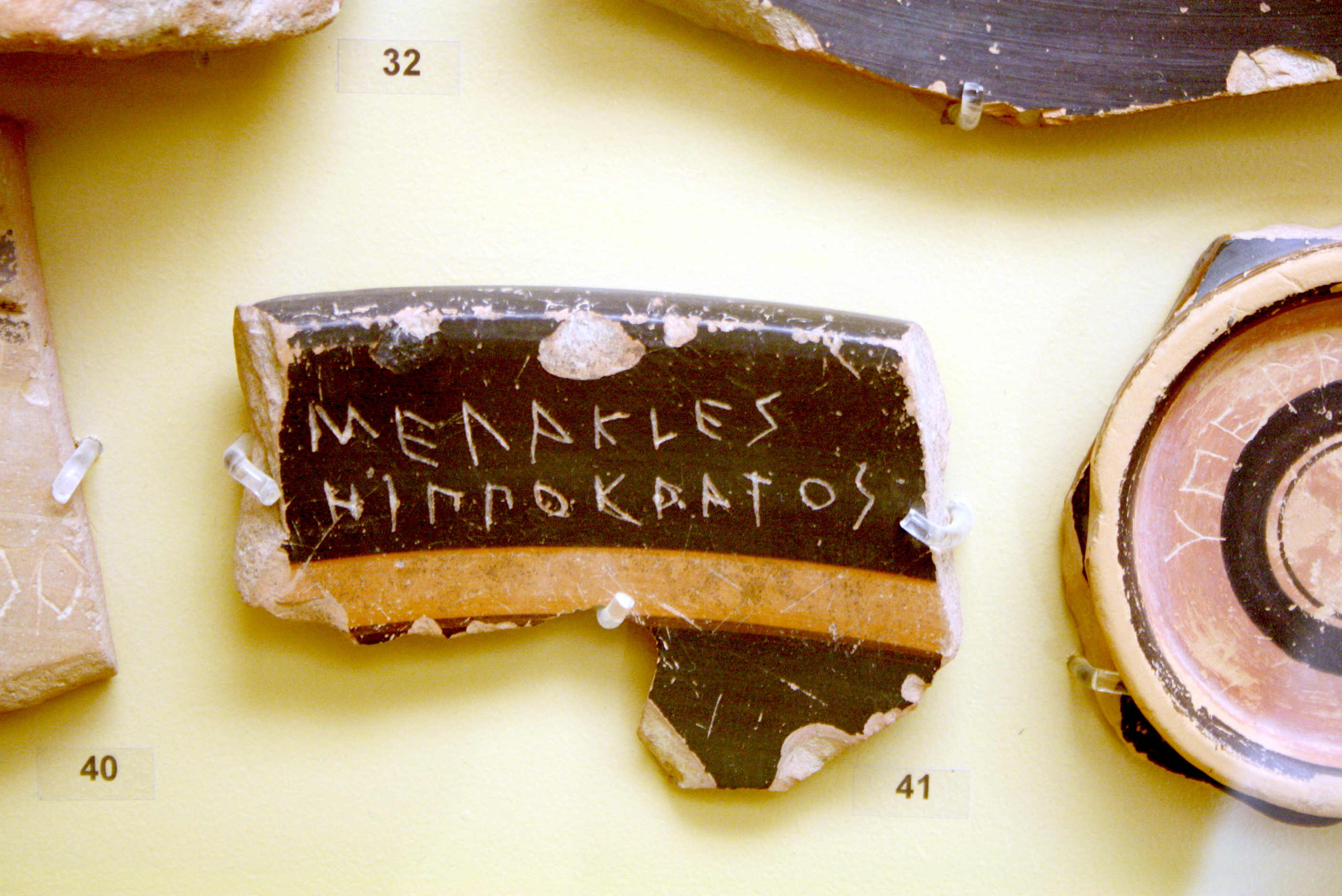
Ostrakon of Megacles, son of Hippocrates (inscription: ΜΕΓΑΚΛΕΣ ΗΙΠΠΟΚΡΑΤΟΣ), 487 BC. On display in the Ancient Agora Museum in Athens, housed in the Stoa of Attalus

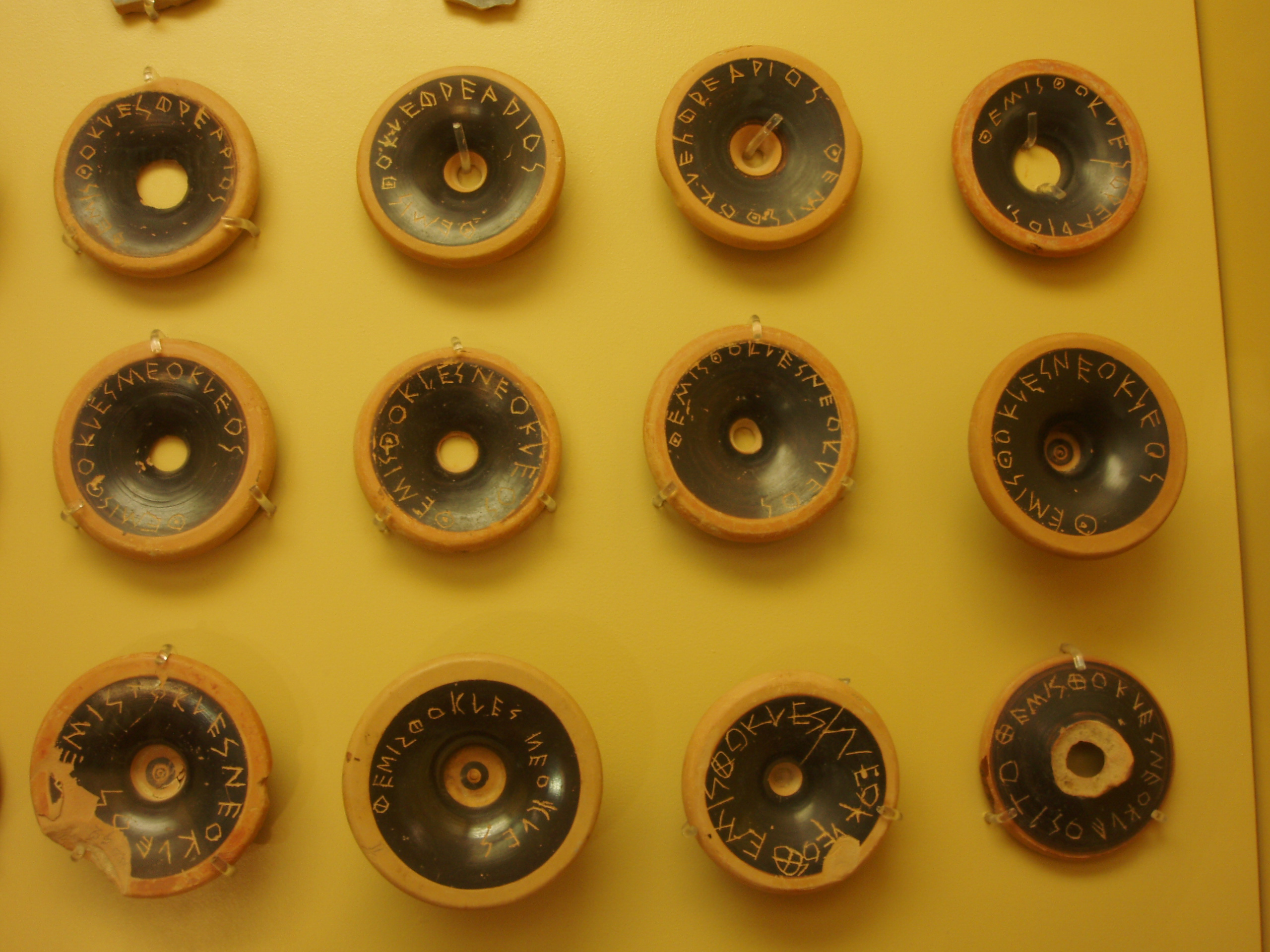
Ancient Greek ostraca voting for the ostracization of Themistocles in 472/471 BC.

An ostracon (Greek: ὄστρακον ostrakon, plural ὄστρακα ostraka) is a piece of pottery, usually broken off from a vase or other earthenware vessel. In an archaeological or epigraphical context, ostraca refer to sherds or even small pieces of stone that have writing scratched into them. Usually these are considered to have been broken off before the writing was added; ancient people used the cheap, plentiful, and durable broken pieces of pottery around them as a convenient medium to write on for a wide variety of purposes, mostly very short inscriptions, but in some cases very long.

== Ostracism ==
In Classical Athens, when the decision at hand was to banish or exile a certain member of society, citizen peers would cast their vote by writing the name of the person on the shard of pottery; the vote was counted and, if unfavorable, the person was exiled for a period of ten years from the city, thus giving rise to the term ostracism. Broken pottery shards were also used for anal hygiene. Scholars have suggested that shards (pessoi) from a vote may have been re-used for this purpose, to curse the exiled individual by soiling their name.

== Egyptian limestone and potsherd ostraca ==
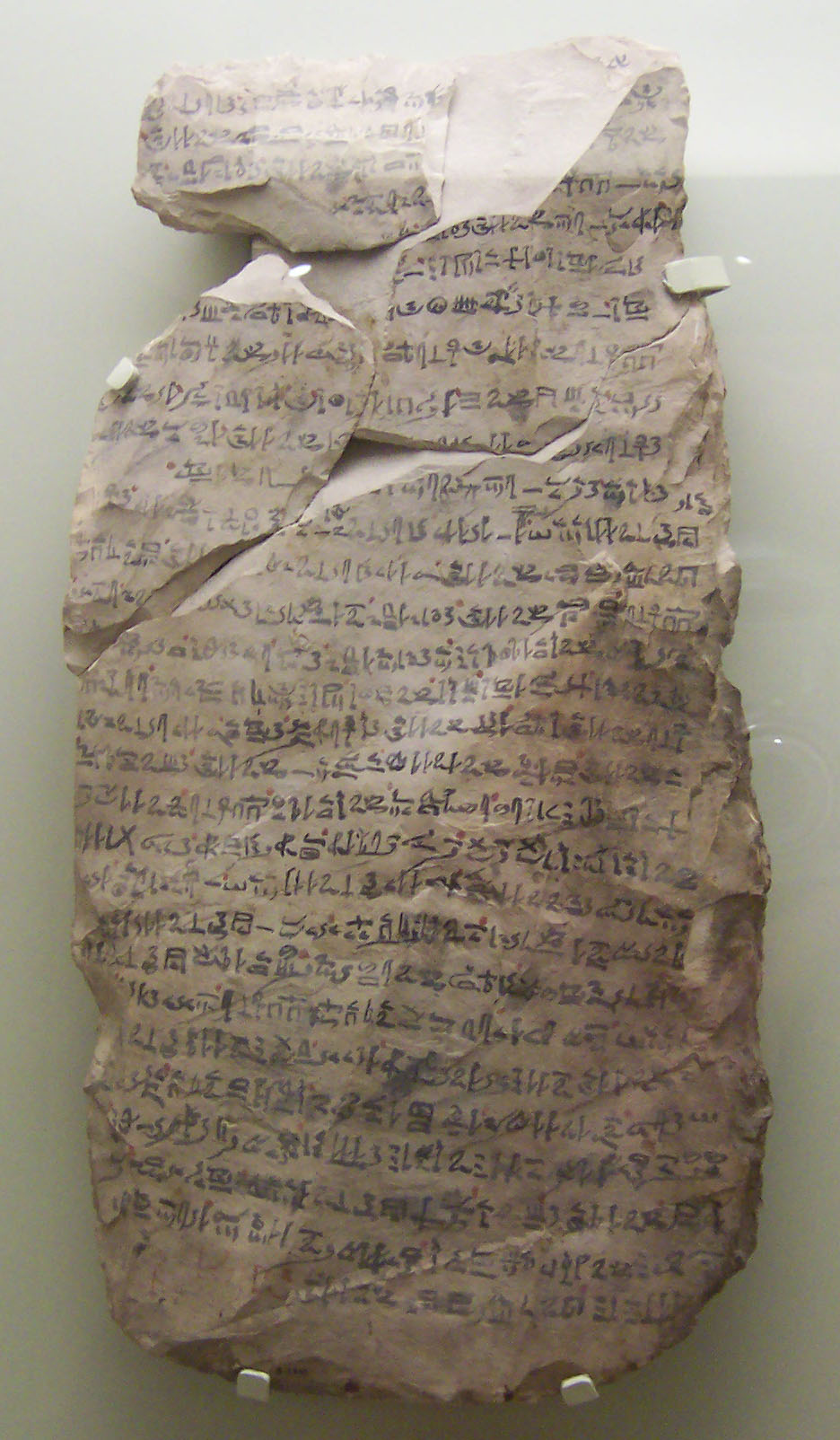
One of four official letters to vizier Khay copied onto a limestone ostracon, in Egyptian Hieratic.

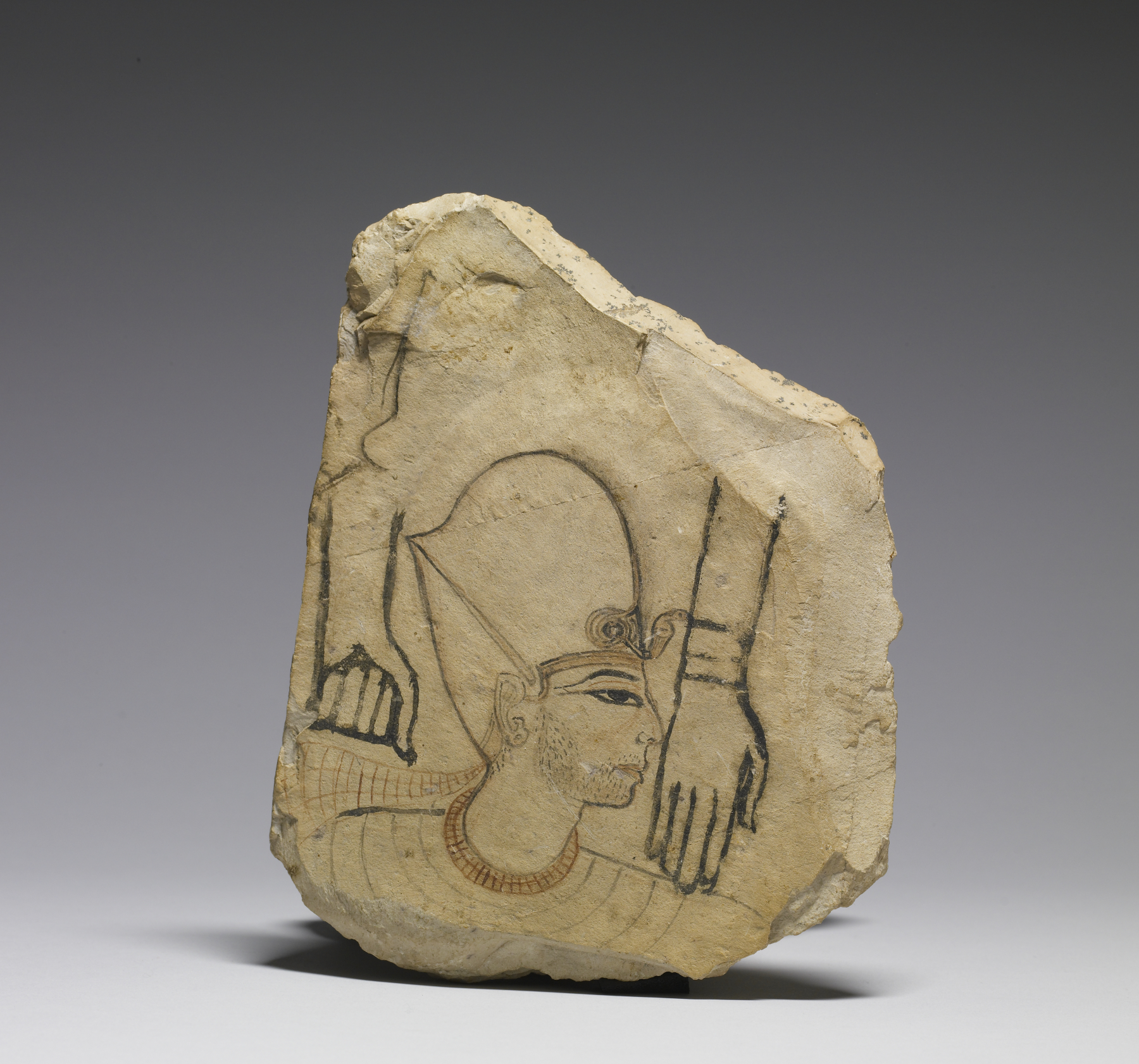
The New Kingdom pharaoh depicted on this limestone fragment bears the finesse of a master's hand. The two arms, however, are rendered more crudely. It is likely that a master used this ostracon to teach his student, and the work of both individuals can be seen on the piece. Walters Art Museum, Baltimore.

Anything with a smooth surface could be used as a writing surface. Generally discarded material, ostraca were cheap, readily available, and therefore frequently used for writings of an ephemeral nature such as messages, prescriptions, receipts, students' exercises, and notes. Pottery sherds, limestone flakes, and thin fragments of other stone types were used, but limestone sherds, being flaky and of a lighter colour, were most common. Ostraca were typically small, covered with just a few words or a small picture drawn in ink; but the tomb of the craftsman Sennedjem at Deir el Medina contained an enormous ostracon inscribed with the Story of Sinuhe.

The importance of ostraca for Egyptology is immense. The combination of their physical nature and the Egyptian climate have preserved texts, from the medical to the mundane, which in other cultures were lost. These can often serve as better witnesses of everyday life than literary treatises preserved in libraries.

=== Deir el-Medina ostraca ===
The 91 ostraca found at Deir el-Medina provide a deeply compelling view into the inner workings of the New Kingdom. These ostraca have shown medical and documentary records, some of which provide information on how water was provided, and how economic transactions were carried out. The extreme variety of information on ostraca that have been found presents information that would have been lost if not written down.

Like other Egyptian communities, the workmen and inhabitants of Deir el-Medina received care through a combination of medical treatment, prayer, and magic. Nevertheless, the records at Deir el-Medina indicate some level of division, as records from the village note both a "physician" who saw patients and prescribed treatments, and a "scorpion charmer" who specialized in magical cures for scorpion stings.

The ostraca from Deir el-Medina also differed in their circulation. Magical spells and remedies were widely distributed among the workmen; there are even several cases of spells being sent from one worker to another, with no "trained" intermediary. Written medical texts appear to have been much rarer, with only a handful of ostraca containing prescriptions, indicating that the trained physician mixed the more complicated remedies himself. There are also several documents that show the writer sending for medical ingredients, but it is unknown whether these were sent according to a physician's prescription, or to fulfill a home remedy.

Six people were assigned to Deir el-Medina as "water carriers" who were tasked to bring sacks of water to the village. Having a system in between a central cistern and door-to-door deliveries, the water carriers filled sacks and delivered them from the floodplain to a central location in the village where each household could receive a quarter to a half of a sack which would amount to ninety six to one hundred and fifteen liters of water per house. The typical household would have six residents, each would get fifteen to twenty liters of water for drinking. One ostracon describes how many of these deliveries were unfulfilled, where five people's rations were undelivered, totaling to four and three quarters sacks or three hundred and seventy-five liters of water gone undelivered. On multiple occasions, the citizens of Deir el-Medina attempted to dig a well, presumably due to their dissatisfaction with the water carriers, but to no avail. The first attempt was during the fifteenth year of Ramesses III where a hole was dug twenty-two meters into the ground, but with no luck. Before digging another, they established the water table sat at thirty-one and a half meter, and in a desperate attempt they dug twenty meters past that, to fifty-two meters, but again it was futile. With no water in the well, it was used as a dump where hundreds more ostraca were found.

Economics were unique in Deir el-Medina as transactions between people were closer to trades than modern transactions. Actual money would rarely change hands, as it was more of a measure of worth for an object and when making a deal, trades between people would consider both the worth of each ends of the trade and whether the items presented were needed. Conveniently, most ostraca found in Deir el-Medina were on economics and provide information on what these trades looked like. One such ostracon details a trade with one side offering an ox that was 120 Deben and the other offering two jars of fat, five smooth cloth tunics, one thin cloth kilt, and one hide which when put altogether were 130 Deben.

=== Saqqara dream ostraca ===
From 1964 to 1971, Bryan Emery excavated at Saqqara in search of Imhotep's tomb; instead, the extensive catacombs of animal mummies were uncovered. Apparently, it was a pilgrimage site, with as many as 1 1/2 million ibis birds interred (as well as cats, dogs, rams, and lions). This 2nd-century BC site contained extensive pottery debris from the site offerings of the pilgrims.

Emery's excavations uncovered the "Dream Ostraca", created by a scribe named Hor of Sebennytos. A devotee of the god Thoth, he lived adjacent to Thoth's sanctuary at the entrance to the North Catacomb and worked as a "proto therapist", advising and comforting clients. He transferred his divinely inspired dreams onto ostraca. The Dream Ostraca are 65 Demotic texts written on pottery and limestone.

== Biblical period ostraca ==
Famous ostraca for Biblical archaeology have been found at:

- Arad, Israel, or Tel Arad
- Lachish
- Mesad Hashavyahu
- Ostraca House at Samaria
- Elah Fortress at Khirbet Qeiyafa

Additionally, the lots drawn at Masada are believed to have been ostraca, and some potsherds resembling the lots have been found.

In October 2008, Israeli archaeologist, Yosef Garfinkel of the Hebrew University of Jerusalem, discovered what he says to be the earliest known Hebrew text. This text was written on an ostracon sherd; Garfinkel believes this sherd dates to the time of King David from the Old Testament, about 3,000 years ago. Carbon dating of the ostracon and analysis of the pottery have dated the inscription to be about 1,000 years older than the Dead Sea Scrolls. The inscription has yet to be deciphered, however, some words, such as king, slave, and judge have been translated. The sherd was found about 20 miles southwest of Jerusalem at the Elah Fortress in Khirbet Qeiyafa, the earliest known fortified city of the biblical period of Israel.

== See also ==
- Ostraca House
- Ostracon of Senemut and Djehuty
- Potsherd
- Satirical ostraca
- Soleto Map
- Monte Testaccio
