= Treasure of El Lahun =

Archaeological find at Senusret II's pyramid

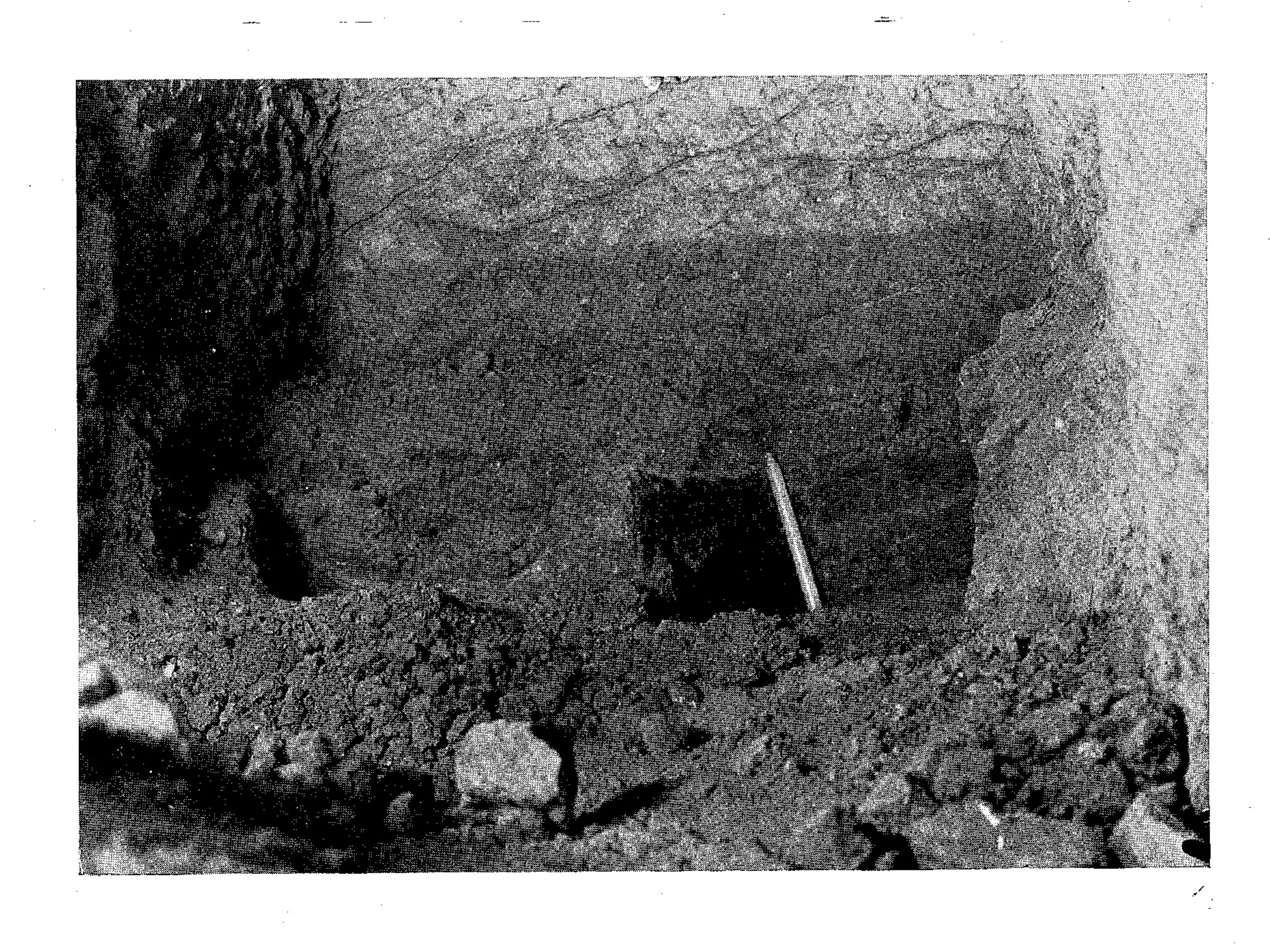
- Site of the discovery within the princess's tomb
- Type: Archaeological discovery
- Housed at: Metropolitan Museum of Art, New York City; Egyptian Museum, Cairo
- Funded by: Henry Walters, Rogers Fund of The Met
- Culture: Ancient Egyptian
- Created: Twelfth Dynasty
- Discovery date: 1914
- Discovery place: Tomb 8, pyramid of Senusret II, El Lahun; 29°14′N 30°58′E
- Discovered by: Guy Brunton, Flinders Petrie
- Website: The Met; The EMC

The treasure of El Lahun is a significant cache of Middle Kingdom artefacts discovered in 'tomb 8', a subsidiary burial belonging to Sithathoriunet, (Note: Sꜣt-ḥwt-ḥr-ỉwnt, literally 'daughter of Hathor of Dendera'.) presumed daughter of Senusret II, at his funerary complex in El Lahun. The treasure was held in decorated ebony chests and features a unique 'crown of Sithathoriunet' bearing an ajouré uraeus with an accompanying gold embellished wig; an exquisite cloisonné 'pectoral of Senusret II' with a minutely-detailed repoussé et ciselé reverse; a second near identical 'pectoral of Amenemhat III'; two distinct sets of jewellery; a set of toiletries, including a mirror with an intricate, inlaid handle; a set of calcite oil and obsidian cosmetic jars; and many other varia. The majority of these finds reside in the Metropolitan Museum of Art (The Met) in New York City, though a few items (Note: Sithathoriunet's crown, 'pectoral of Amenemhat III', mirror, half of the gold rings, and an inlaid scarab.) are in the Egyptian Museum (the EMC) in Cairo.

Sithathoriunet lived through the reigns of three pharaohs – Senusret II, Senusret III, and Amenemhat III – during the apogee of the Middle Kingdom, when she amassed a considerable collection of valuable items. Upon her death, she was buried with these in a shaft tomb south of Senusret II's pyramid. The tomb was plundered in antiquity, but the robbers failed to notice a small recess carved into the lower half of the antechamber's west wall that contained five chests bearing many of her riches. The breaching of her tomb left it open to the elements allowing successive floods to fill the recess with mud and bury her treasures. While the organic contents of her hoard decayed and the tarnishable materials corroded irreparably, the artefacts sat otherwise undisturbed for millennia.

In early February 1914, archaeologists working for the British School of Archaeology in Egypt (BSAE) under Flinders Petrie rediscovered and cleared the recess, carefully documenting every minute bead, scrap of material, and surviving artefact. Gaston Maspero, then Director-General of the Department of Antiquities, chose only a few items for the museum in Cairo, as it had already received similar hoards from the galleries of Sithathor and Mereret at Dahshur. The remainder were put up for sale by Petrie and purchased by The Met in 1916. Though the Great War delayed their delivery, the treasures were finally transported from London to New York City in 1919.

== Provenance ==
The cache was discovered about 10 February 1914 and reported by Flinders Petrie in The Times (UK) on 20 May 1914. Yet, the full publication of the excavation reports at the site of the pyramid of Senusret II – Lahun I by Guy Brunton and Lahun II by Petrie, Brunton, and Margaret Alice Murray – was delayed until 1920 and 1923 respectively owing to the course of the Great War. A similar hoard was discovered by Jacques de Morgan at Dahshur on 7–8 March 1894 (Note: The tombs of Sithathor, daughter of Senusret II, and Mereret, daughter of Senusret III, at the pyramid of Senusret III offered up hundreds of items that had been preserved, hidden in the lower gallery of the pyramid's substructure.) and is in the possession of the Egyptian Museum (the EMC), such that only a few items from the Lahun cache were taken for it by Gaston Maspero, the then Director General of Antiquities in Egypt, whilst the majority were purchased by the Metropolitan Museum of Art (The Met) in 1916 from the Rogers Fund and a gift from Henry Walters, the Second Vice President of the Museum. The war too delayed the transfer of the artefacts, which were stored in Britain until 1919 when they were finally shipped to New York.

The treasure was contained in the easternmost of four shaft tombs sunk south of the pyramid, designated 'tomb 8', and was built during the reign of Amenemhat III some 38 years after Senusret II's death. It had been robbed anciently, as evidenced by looting of her sarcophagus. It was accessed through a deep shaft that led to the antechamber. This chamber's walls were separated into two sections, with the treasure recess inset in the centre of the lower half of the west wall. It was approximately 1 m (3 ft 3 in; 1.9 cu) wide, cut 1.6 m (5 ft 3 in; 3.1 cu) deep, and had a sloped ceiling 1 m (3 ft 3 in; 1.9 cu) high. On discovery, it was three-quarters filled with mud which had to be carefully cleared to retrieve its contents. The treasure was originally held in five wooden chests stored within the recess that had since decayed, along with other organic material, such as the threads of the necklaces and wigs of hair, and tarnishable materials, such as silver and copper fittings.

It belonged to Sithathoriunet, a sꜣt-nsw (Note: King's daughter) of the Twelfth Dynasty who lived through the reigns of her presumed father, Senusret II, and the pharaohs Senusret III, a possible husband, and Amenemhat III, a possible nephew. Her name and title (Note: Sithathoriunet's only known title is sꜣt-nsw, there is no record of her holding the ḥmt-nsw, 'king's wife', title.) survived on the banded calcite canopic jars and magic jar recovered from her burial chamber. Her tomb contained the only extant records of her existence. She lived during the cultural peak of the Middle Kingdom, and was the beneficiary of its fruits as the recipient of some of the finest jewellery crafted by ancient Egyptians.

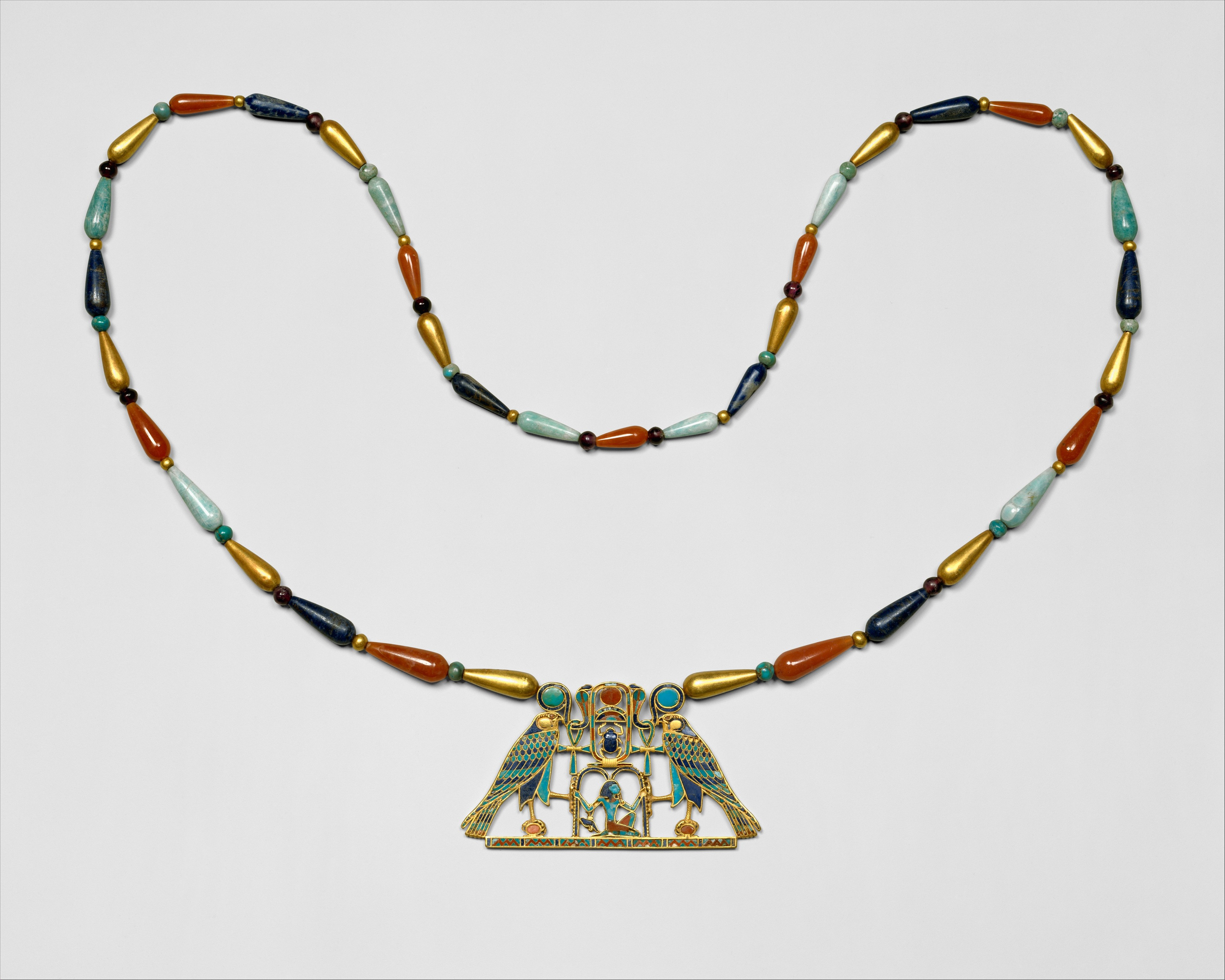
The cloisonné 'pectoral of Senusret II' hung from a necklace of gold and semi-precious gems

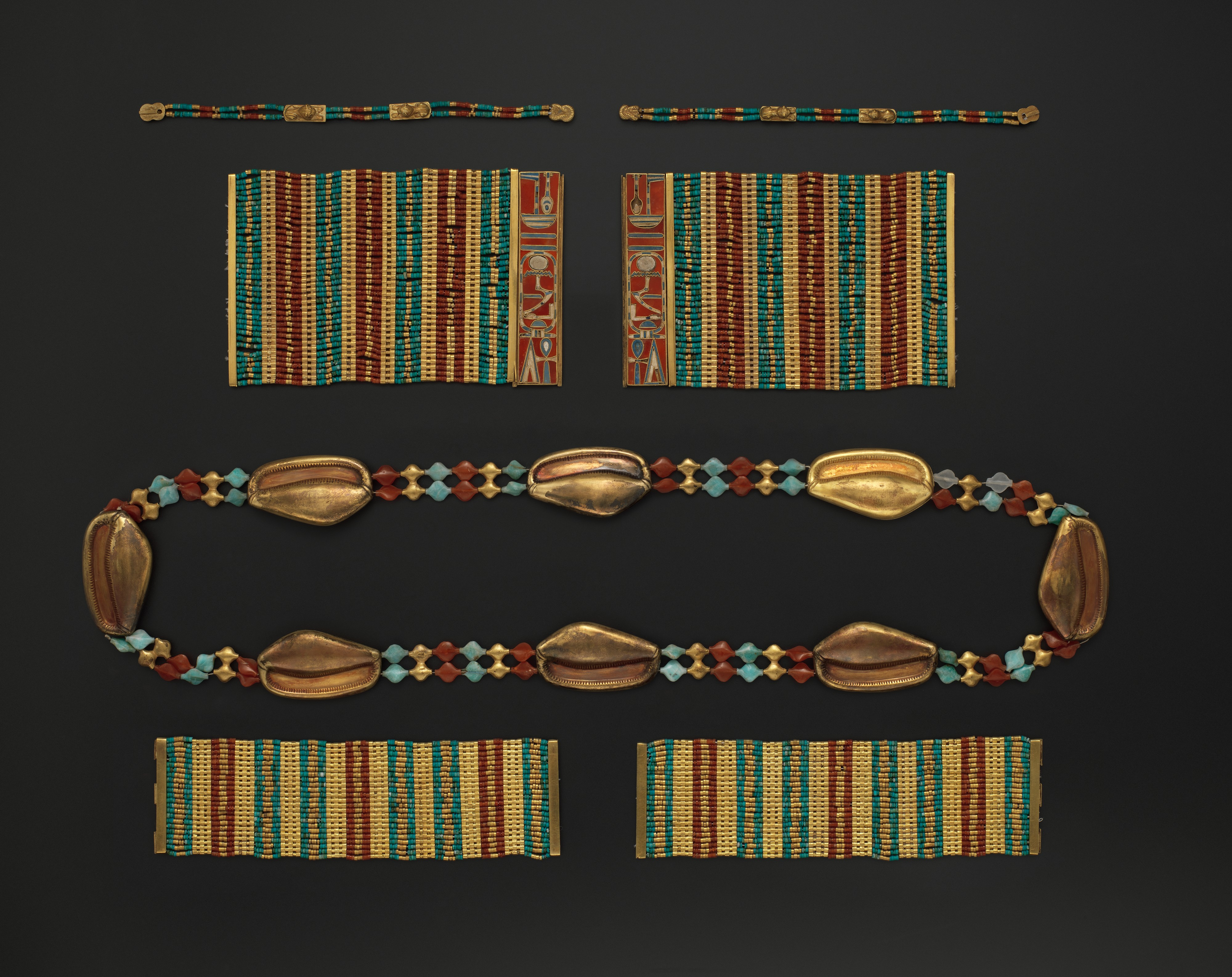
The recumbent lion wristlets, broad bracelets, cowrie shell girdle, and broad anklets of gold and semi-precious stones

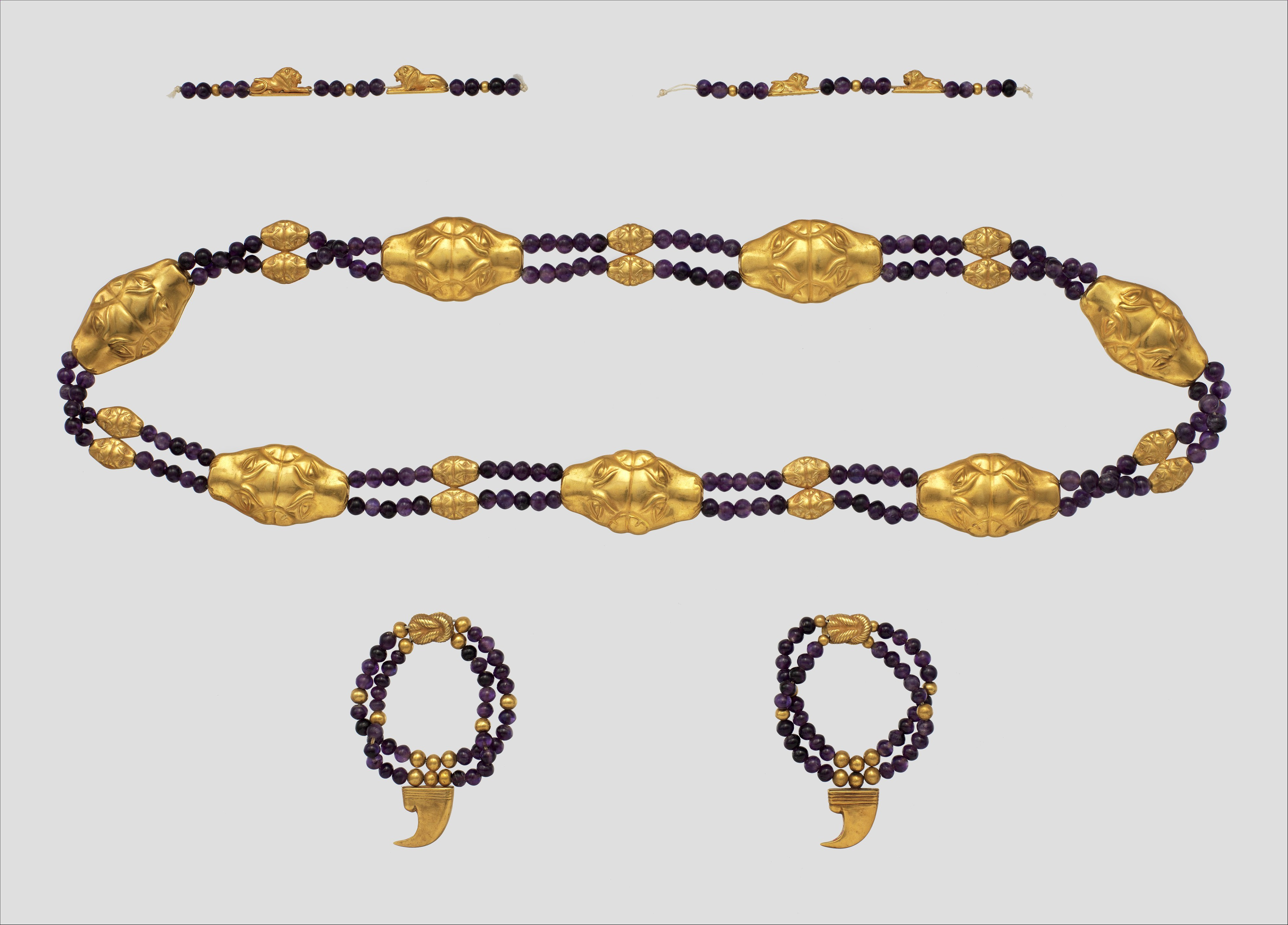
The recumbent lion wristlets, leopard head girdle, and claw anklets all of gold and amethyst

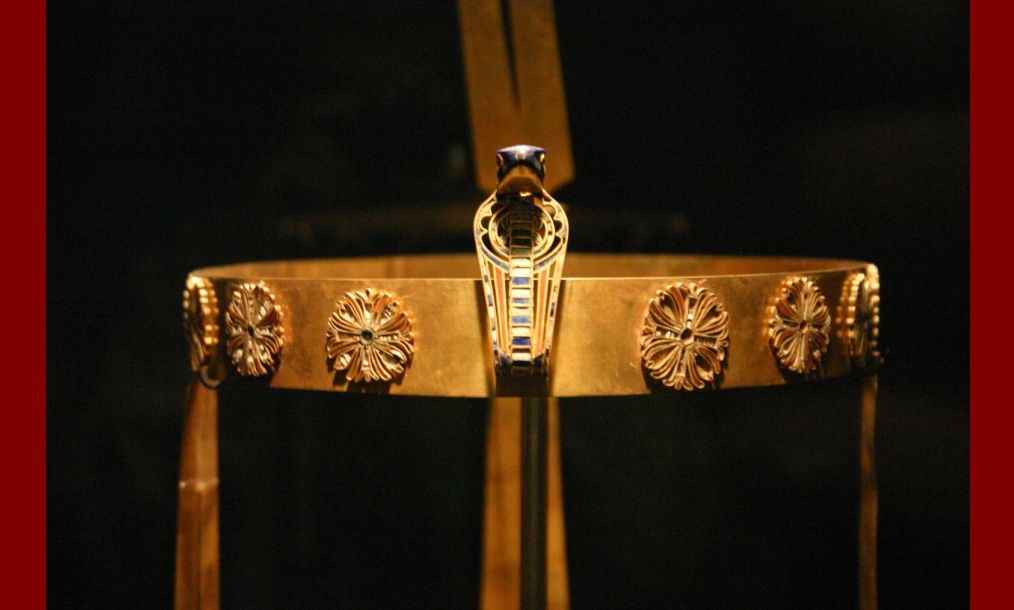
The gold crown of Sithathoriunet adorned with rosettes and streamers and bearing the royal uraeus

== Chests ==
Jewellery chest of Sithathoriunet
Material	Ebony, ivory, gold, silver, carnelian, blue faïence
Height	36.7 cm (1 ft 2.4 in)
Width	46 cm (1 ft 6 in)
Depth	32.5 cm (1 ft 0.8 in)
Symbols	Hathor heads, Djed pillars, False doors
Present location	Metropolitan Museum of Art, New York City
Identification	MET 16.1.1

Two of the five chests belonging to Sithathoriunet were reconstructed by Arthur Cruttenden Mace for The Met. He wrote of them, in the museum's Bulletin, 'weary of reference-hunting and the quest of the elusive adjective, an object with a story comes as a real godsend ... for not only do we know their full past history ... but we have been the means ... of adding a further chapter to that history by restoring them'. For the reconstruction, the ivory inlays were restored by Mikumasa Miki, the wood by George Clarihew, and the colour by 'Miss Cartland'.

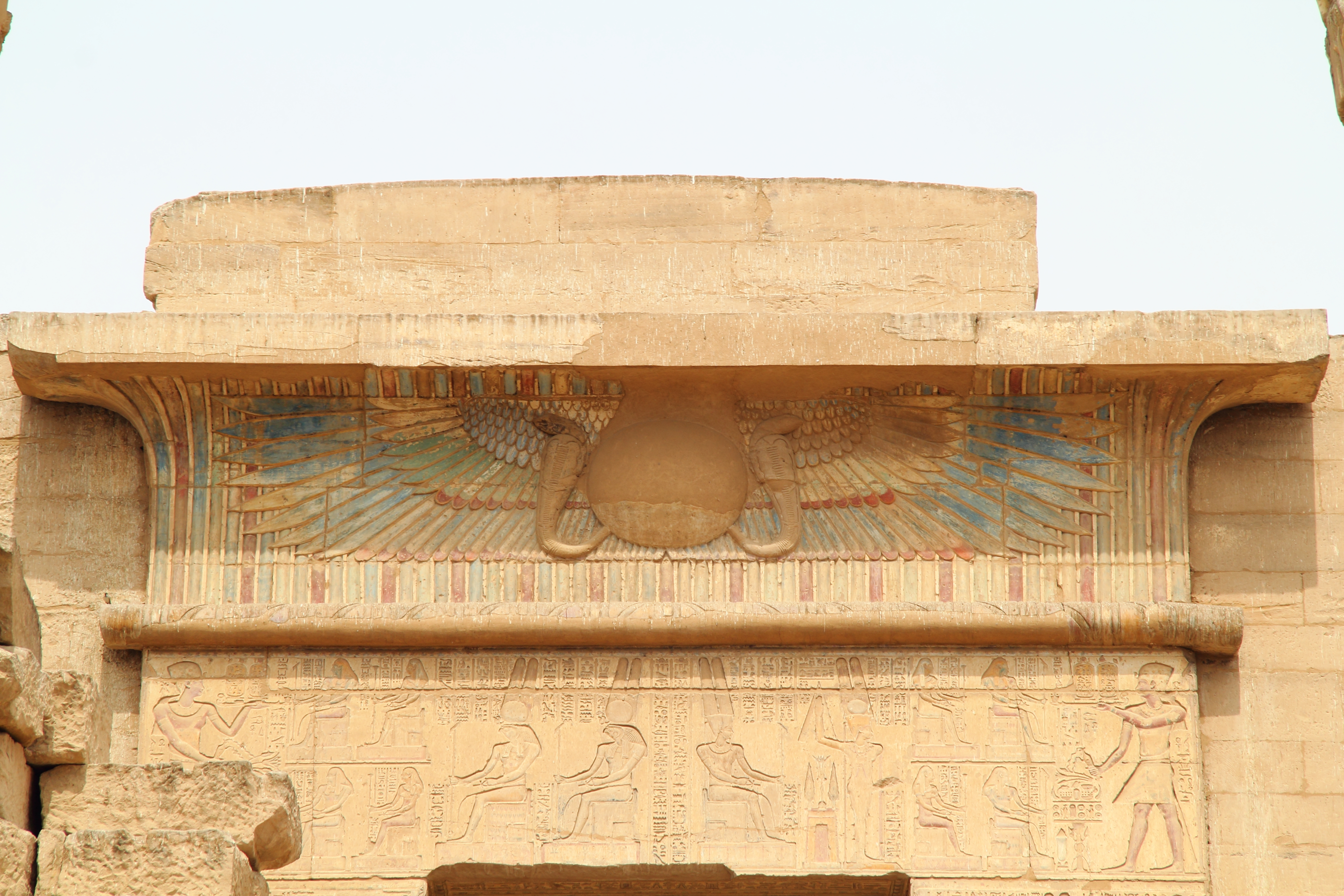
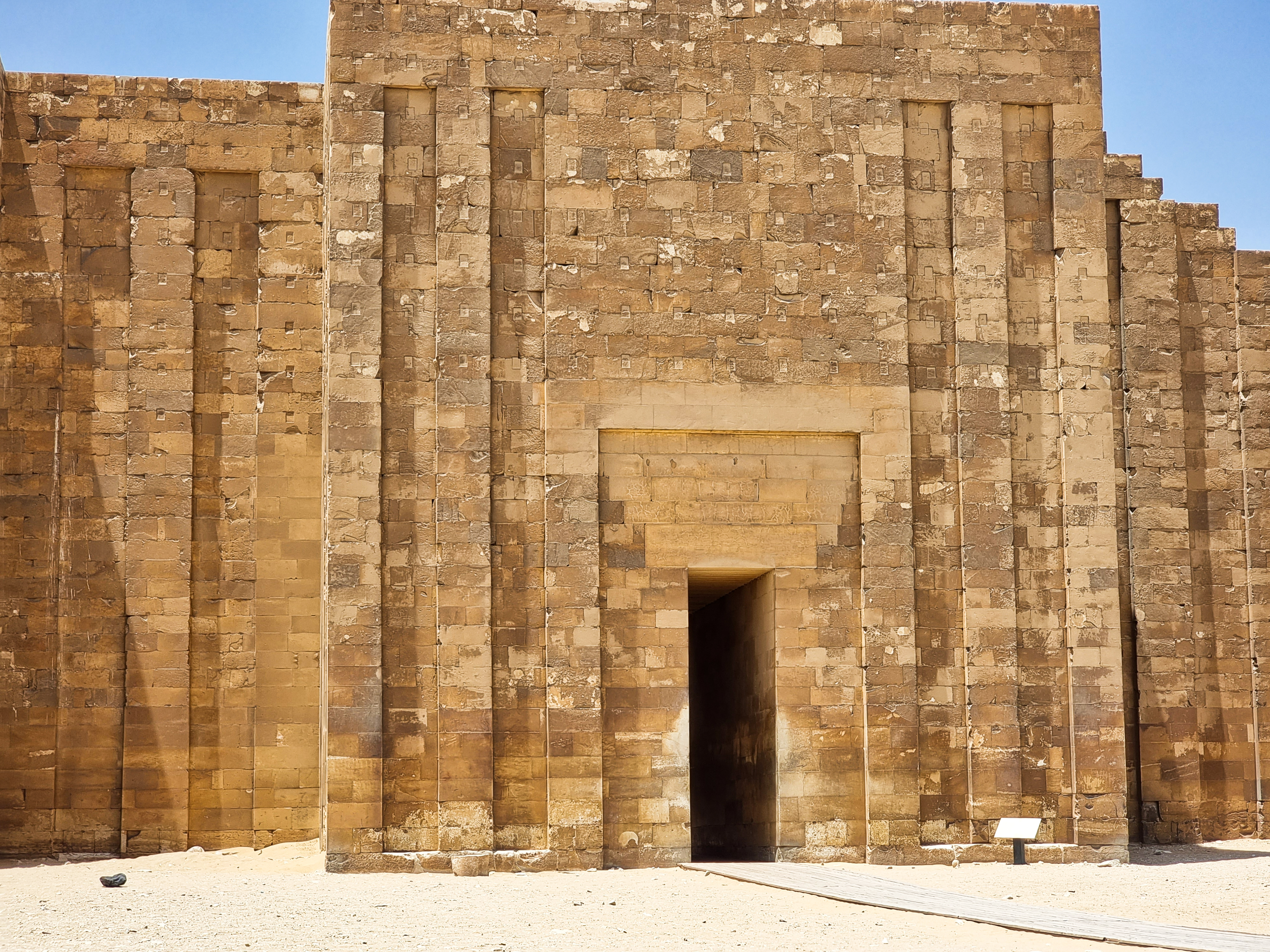
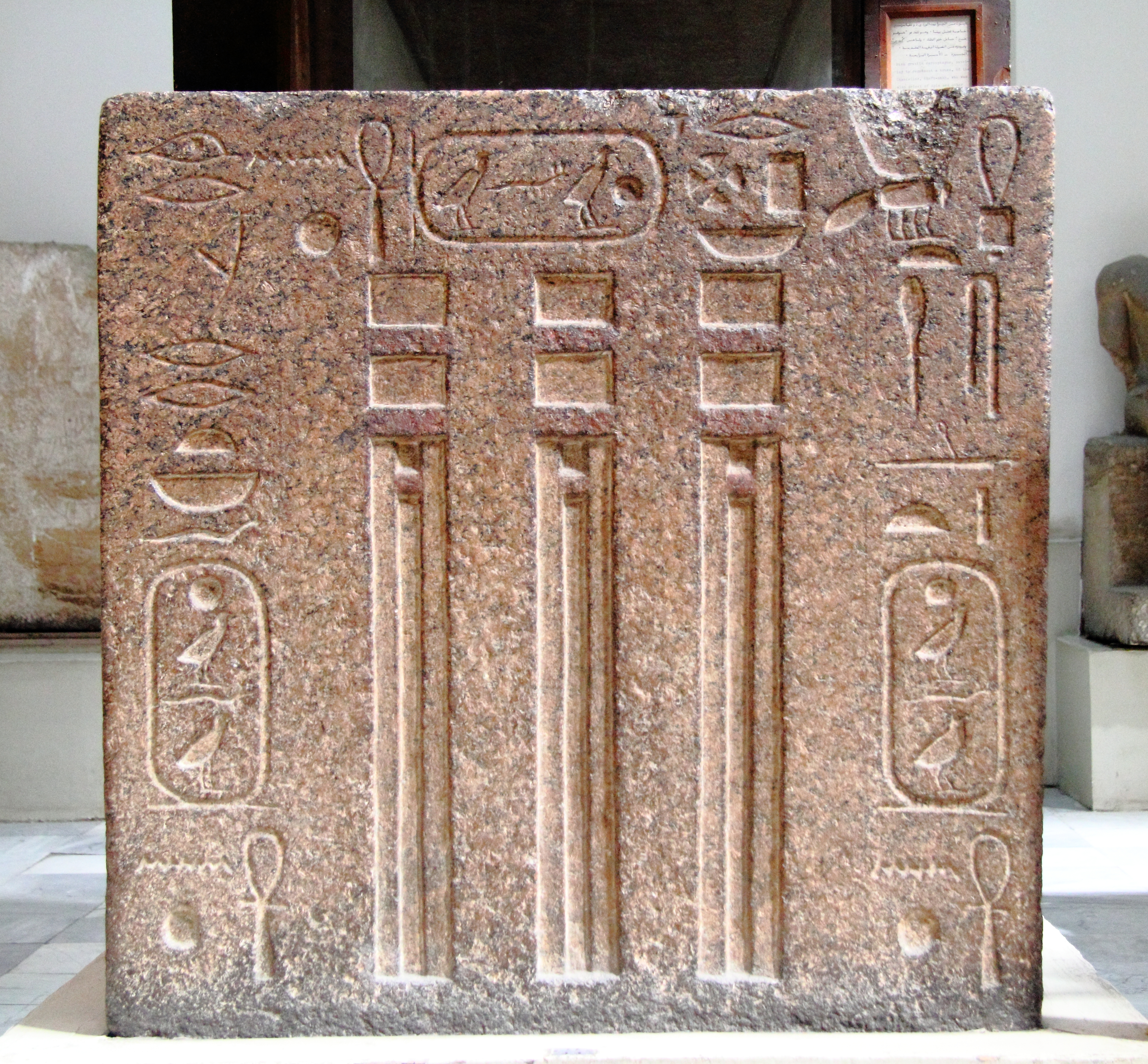
The larger ebony chest – the jewellery chest – had decorated ivory panels inlaid with 20 gold-sheathed wooden Djed pillars (𓊽) representing 'stability', and 16 blue Egyptian faïence and gold-framed carnelian false doors. These images were arrayed so that six pillars and five false doors appeared lengthwise, and four pillars and three false doors presented depthwise. Each image was framed with ivory veneers and separated using ebony strips and the panels were laid in a projecting ebony frame with curved silver struts flowing down to the gold encased ebony feet. The frame was crowned by a gold torus mould and ivory cavetto cornice replicating an important style in Egyptian architecture. (Note: The torus mould and cavetto cornice trace their history back to the Old Kingdom. The former first appeared at the Step Pyramid of Djoser, with the latter introduced at the temple of Harmakhis – Horus in the Akhet – in Giza, east of the Great Sphinx. These two decorations were then rapidly adopted and appear throughout Egyptian architecture. The cavetto spread beyond Egypt into Syria-Palestine and abroad to Persia and Italy.) (Note: Exemplar of the torus mould with cavetto cornice from the temple at Medinet Habu of Ramesses III of the Twentieth Dynasty) The body thus imitated the niched facade of a monumental enclosure wall or the panelling of a sarcophagus. (Note: The recessed façade of the enclosure wall of the Step Pyramid of Djoser of the Third Dynasty The reticulated panelling of the sarcophagus of Khufuankh from the Fourth Dynasty)

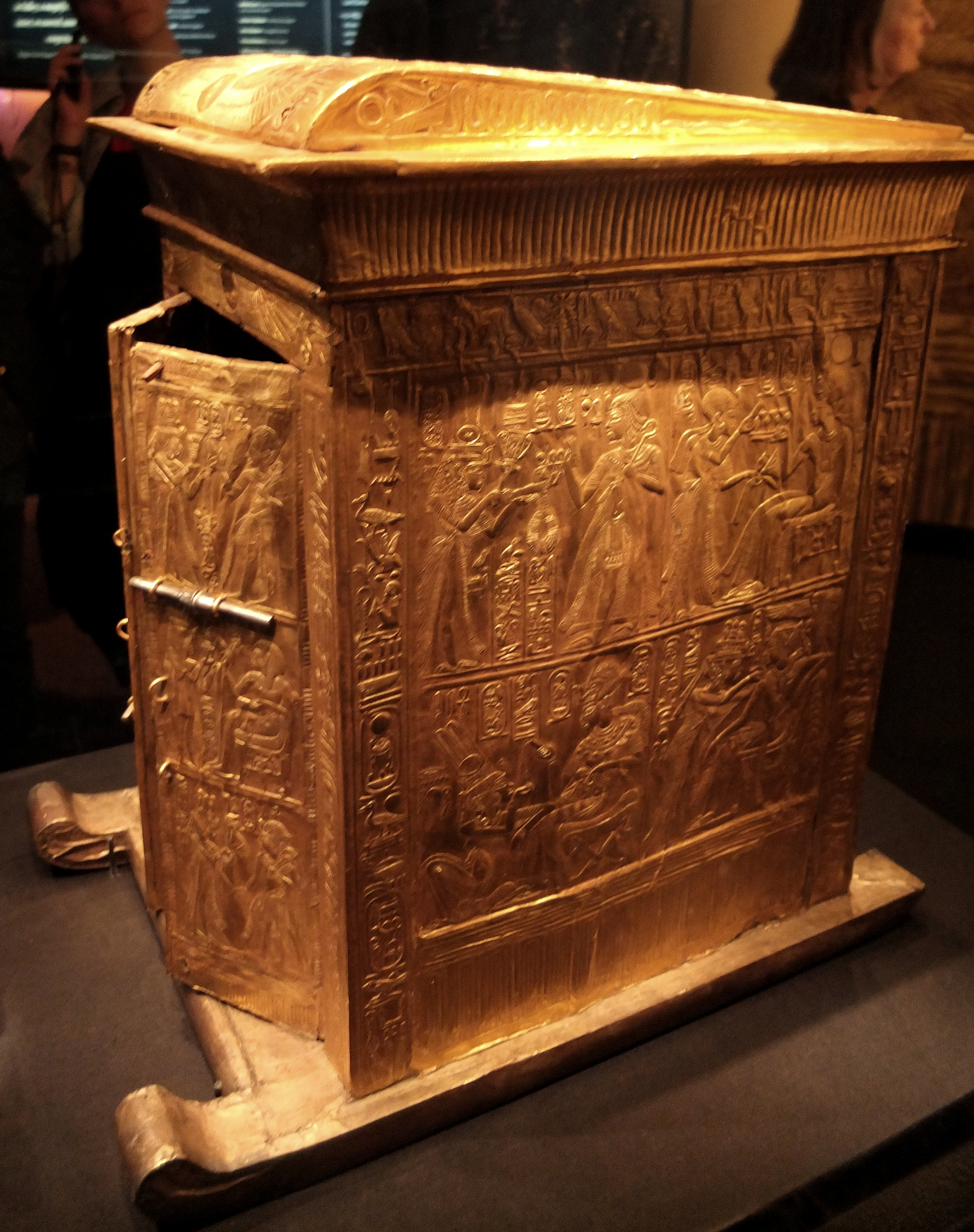
The forward face of the chest had a fastened knob, probably originally of copper but reconstructed of silver, and a second one inserted into the lid above. The ebony lid had a prominent curve, reminiscent of a shrine or naos but oriented perpendicularly to the norm, (Note: The golden shrine of Tutankhamun of the Eighteenth Dynasty displaying the curved top in the usual orientation on the short-axis, with the torus mould and cavetto cornice underneath) that was decorated with four inlaid images of Hathor. Her face was gold with slots into which white stone eyes with black pupils and blue faïence eyebrows were set. Gold horns sprouted from her head to host a carnelian sun disk encircled with a band of gold and silver whilst wavy hair of gold and blue faïence strips flowed into a curl (Note: This type of hairstyle is often referred to as 'Hathoric curls' or 'Hathoric hairstyle'. This is a misnomer, as the style is not attested on images of the goddess prior to the late Twelfth Dynasty, whilst images from outside of Egypt display it many centuries earlier.) of gold embedded with a carnelian gem. Finally, from her neck hung a pectoral of horizontal carnelian and blue faïence strips partitioned by gold. Interspersed between the Hathor heads were probably three ivory inlays bearing the titulary of Amenemhat III, but these had been assigned to the smaller ebony chest during Mace's reconstruction.

The interior was presumably divided into compartments to host the chest's articles, but their composition is now indeterminate. The chest contained two sets of items: adornments for the princess including the 'pectoral of Senusret II', and the principal components of two sets of jewellery; and toiletries including a mirror, razors, whetstones, and a silver dish. There is slight evidence from the burials of Sithathor and Mereret at the pyramid of Senusret III in Dahshur to suppose that other similar chests existed, but none have thus been recovered.

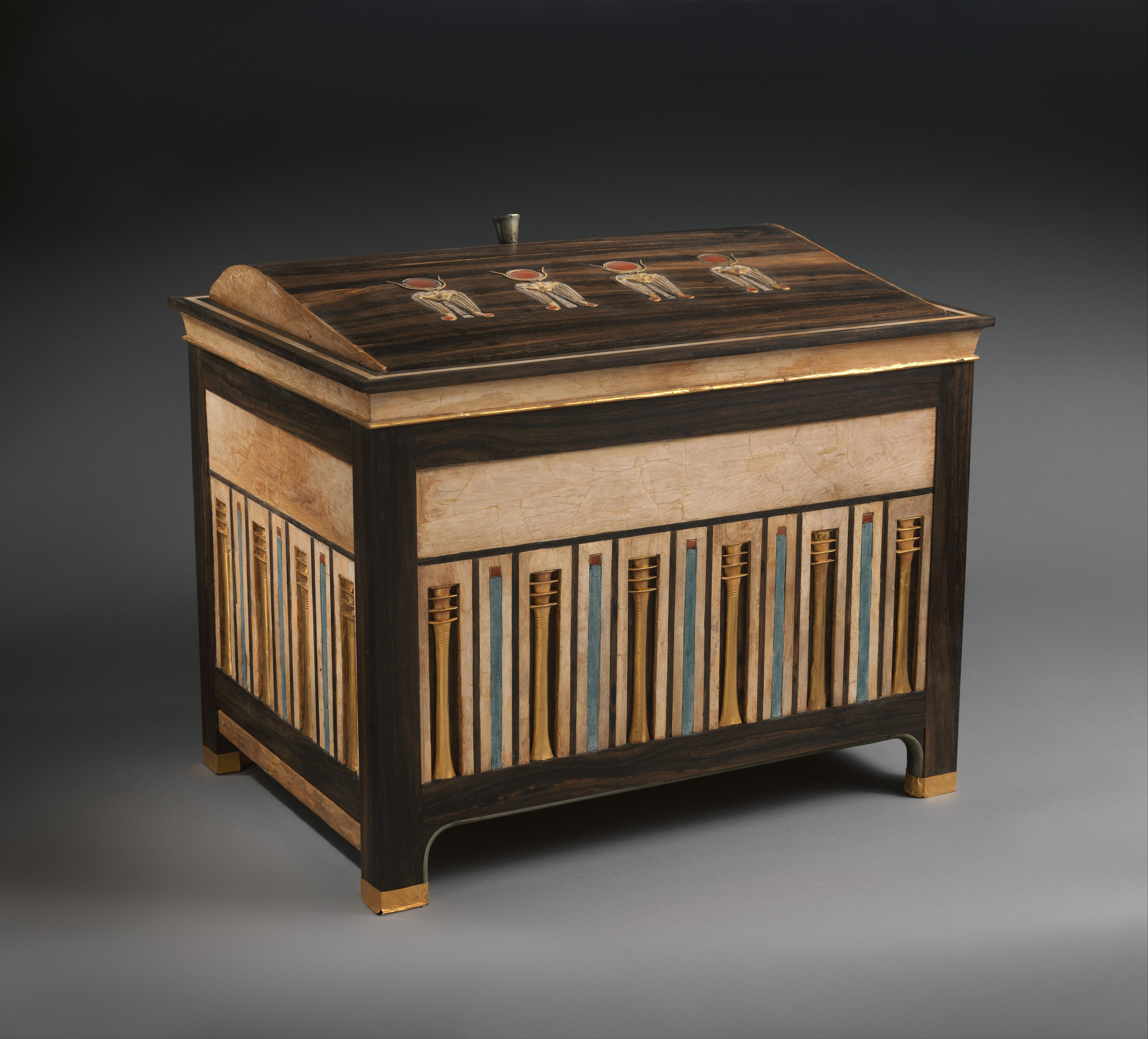
Restored ebony jewellery chest in The Met bearing images of Hathor

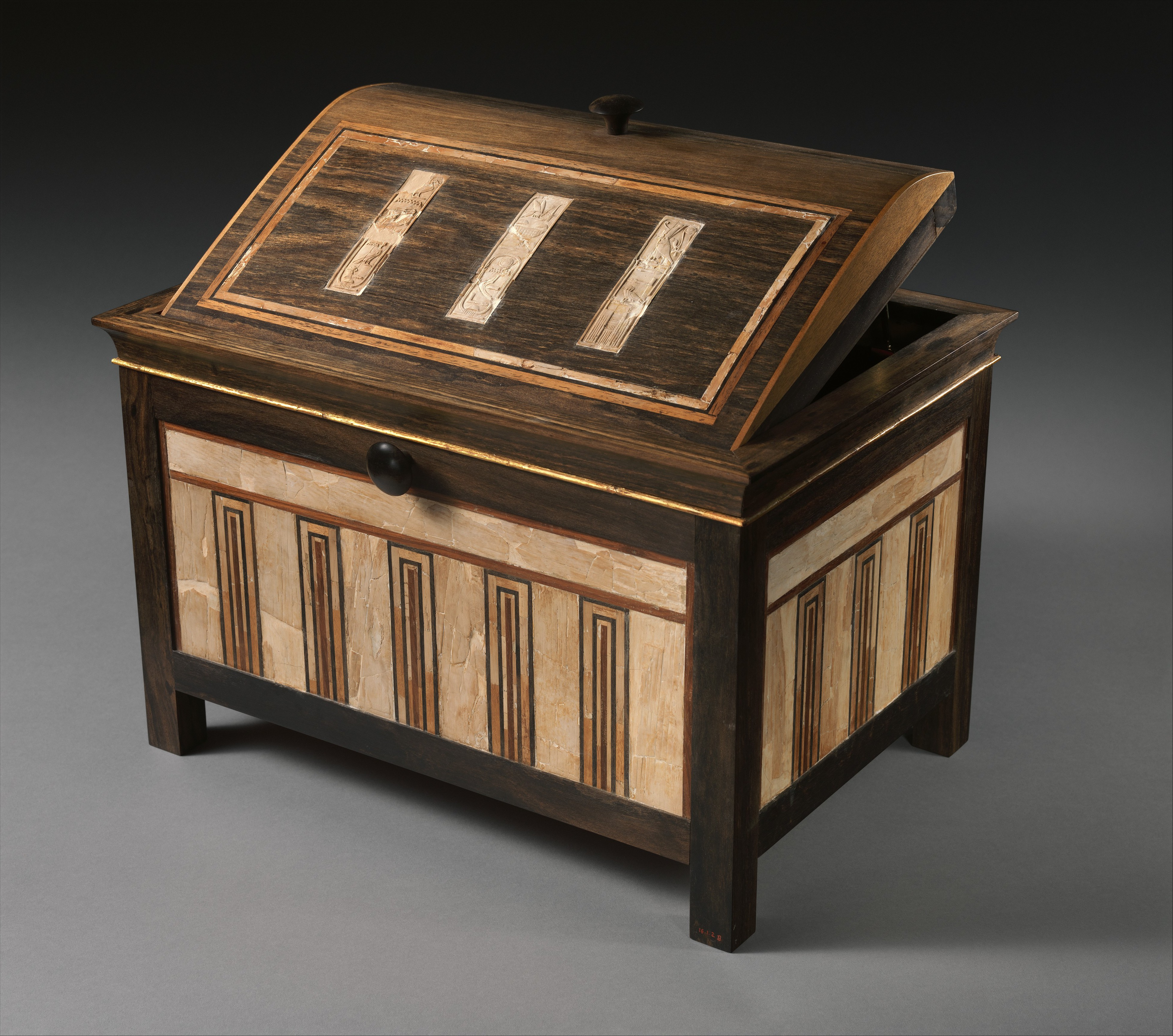
Restored ebony cosmetic chest in The Met bearing the titulary of Amenemhat III

Cosmetics chest of Sithathoriunet
Material	Ebony, red wood, ivory, gold
Height	25.2 cm (9.9 in)
Width	36.4 cm (1 ft 2.3 in)
Depth	25.2 cm (9.9 in)
Writing	Egyptian hieroglyphs
Symbols	Cartouches, Serekhs, False doors
Present location	Metropolitan Museum of Art, New York City
Identification	MMA 16.1.2a, b

The smaller chest – the cosmetics chest – had the same basic form as the first, but different decoration. By Mace's own admission, the reconstruction for this second chest is much less firm than for the first. It had ivory panels with inlaid false doors composed of strips of red wood, ebony, and ivory presenting a variation of the niched design of the first. This was framed by an ebony body with plain ebony feet and was crowned with a gold torus moulding and an ebony cavetto cornice; however, this moulding originated from a third chest and there was no ivory to support the rebuilt cavetto. It had a curved lid with an ivory and wood border, a frame for the three ivory veneers bearing the nomen, praenomen, and Horus name of Amenemhat III. These probably originate from the jewellery chest interspersed between the images of Hathor. The single internal compartment of the chest was used to store calcite ointment jars, but this too was probably not their original purpose. The manner and placement in which the remnants of the chest were found, remarkably allows a portion of its story to be recounted. Upon Sithathoriunet's burial, the cosmetics chest was placed within the recess atop the jewellery chest. Once her tomb was breached by graverobbers, periodic flooding of the recess with mud instigated the rotting process of the jewellery chest, which, weakening with time, buckled under the weight of the chest atop giving way and causing the cosmetics chest to tumble off and onto its lid. Here it lay upturned for millennia, until it was fortuitously rediscovered by the team of British archaeologists that toiled away at the site in 1914.

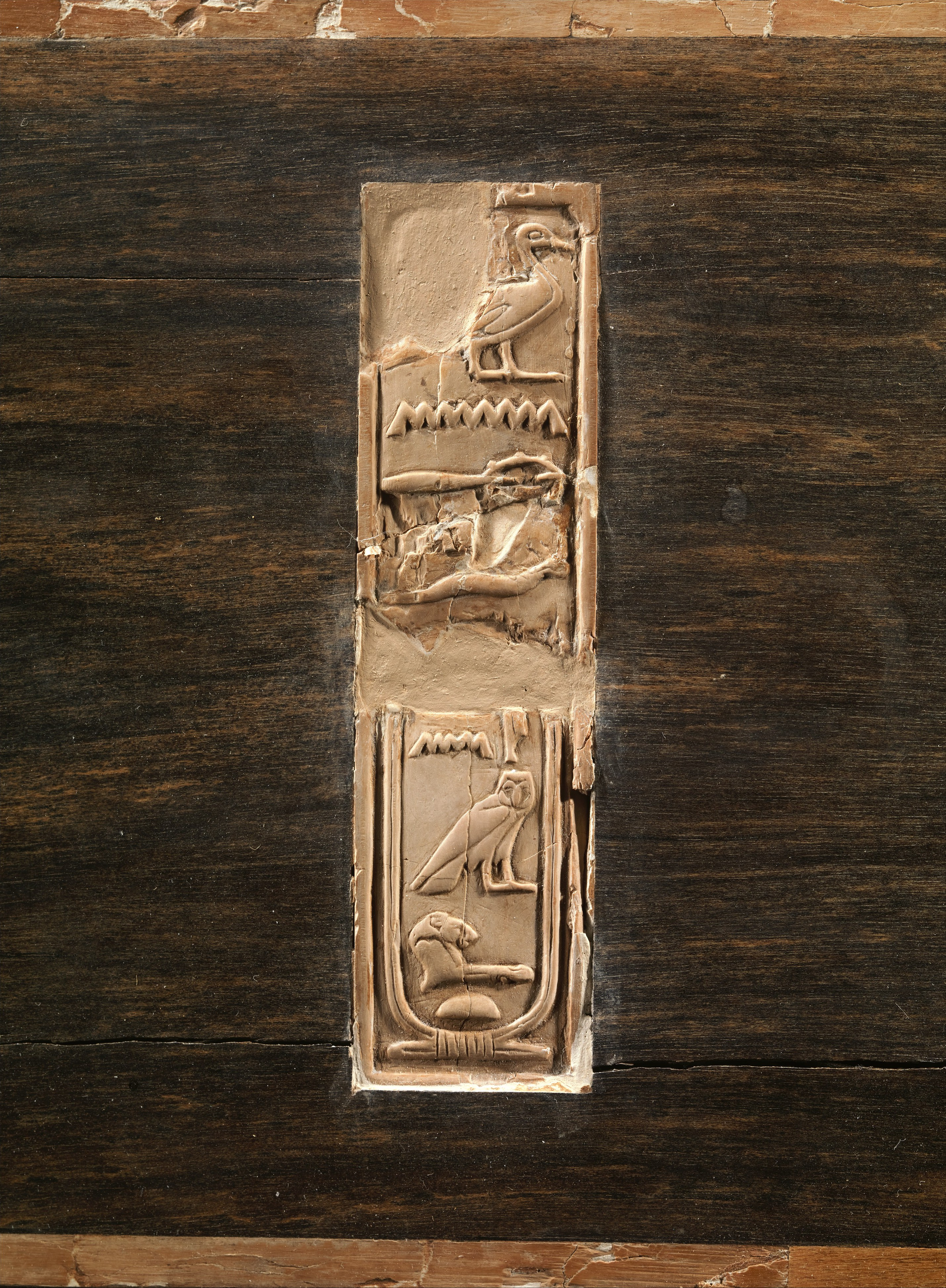
sꜣ-[rꜥ] n ḫt f [ỉmn]-m-ḥꜣt
'Son of Ra, of his body, Amenemhat'

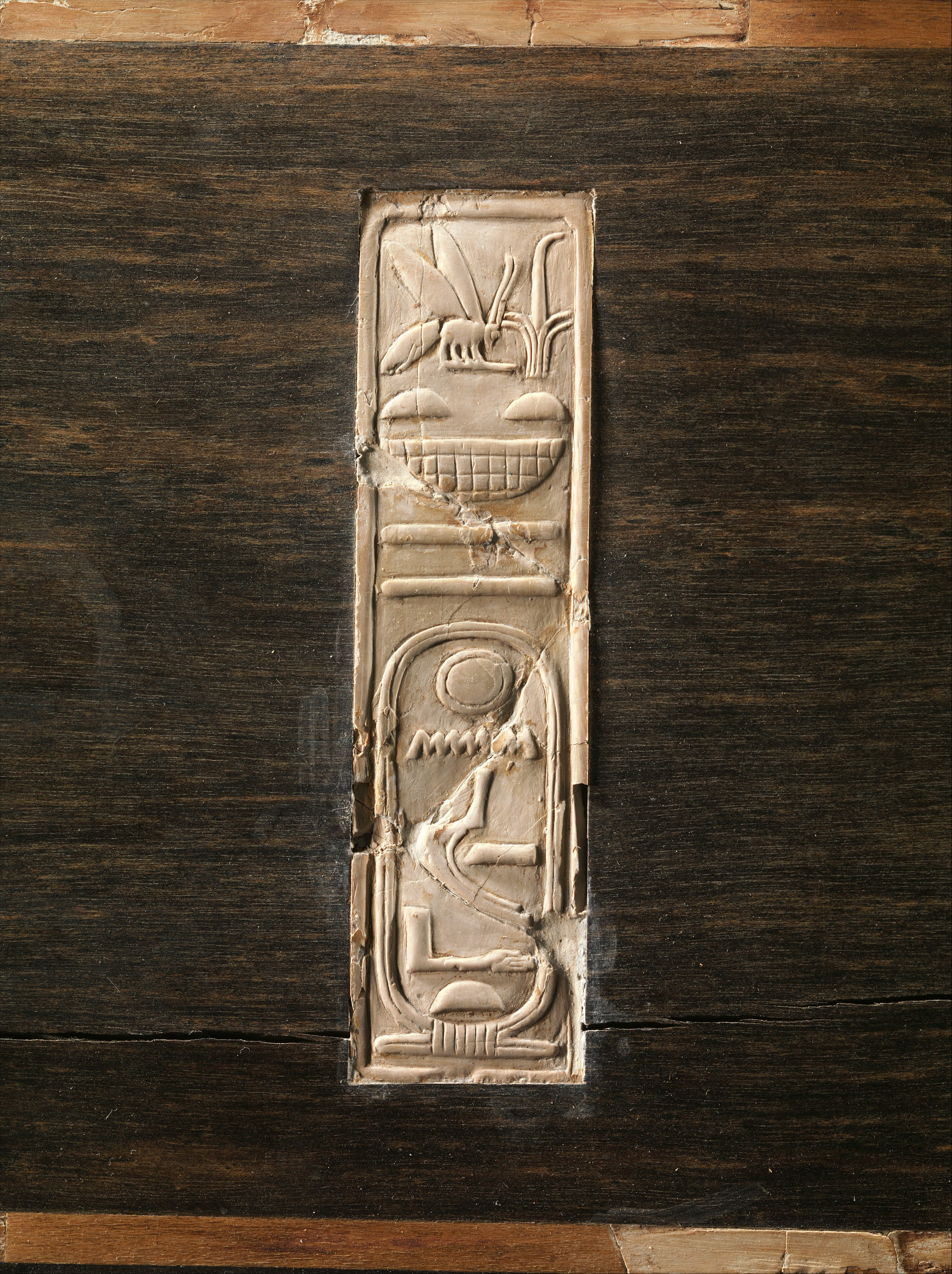
nsw-bỉty nb tꜣwy nỉ-mꜣꜥt-rꜥ
'King of Upper and Lower Egypt, (Note: Or, literally, 'He of the Sedge and Bee'.) lord of the Two Lands, Nimaatre'

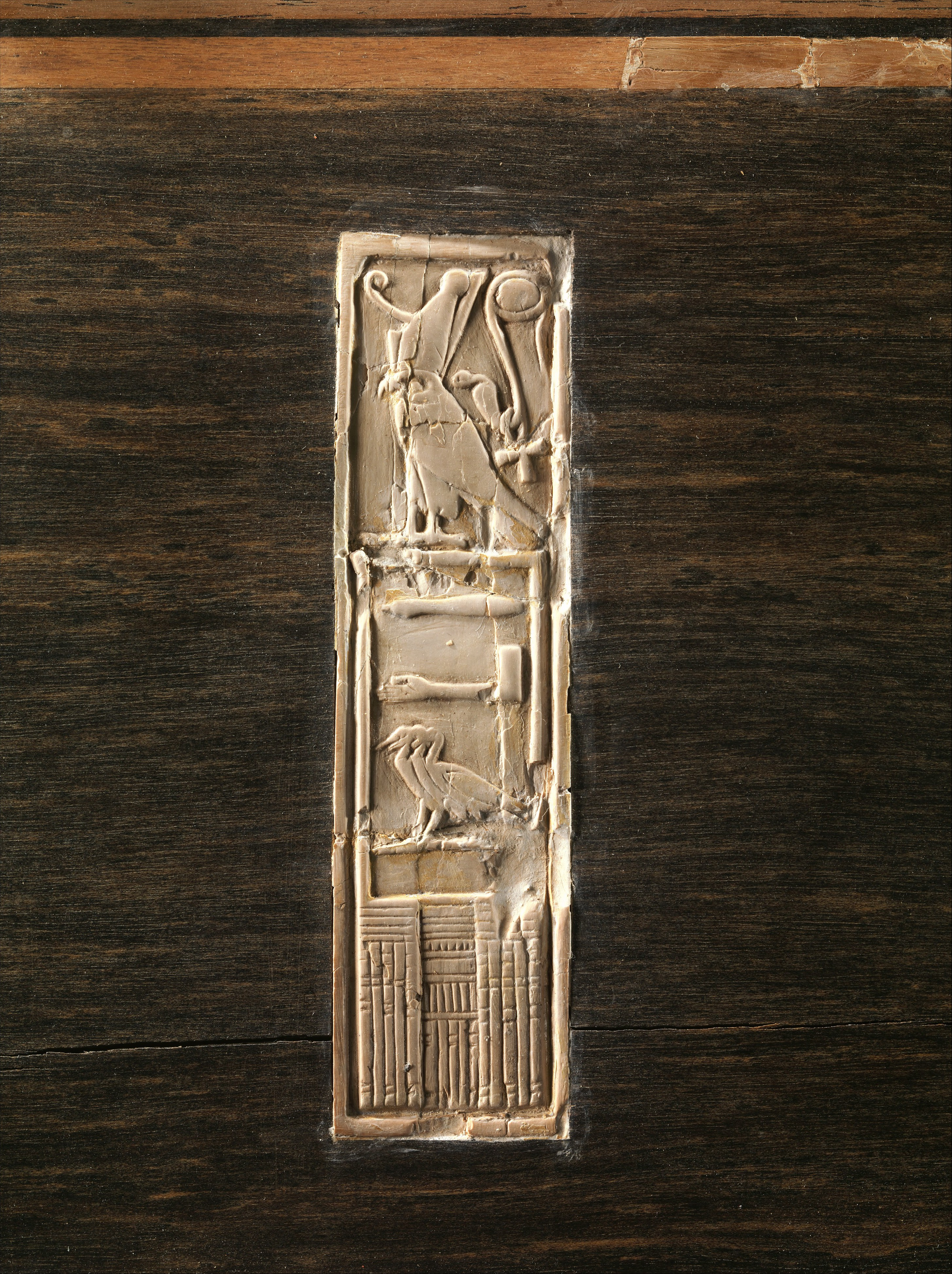
ḥrw ꜥnḫ ḏt ꜥꜣ-bꜣw
'The everlasting Horus, Aa-bau'

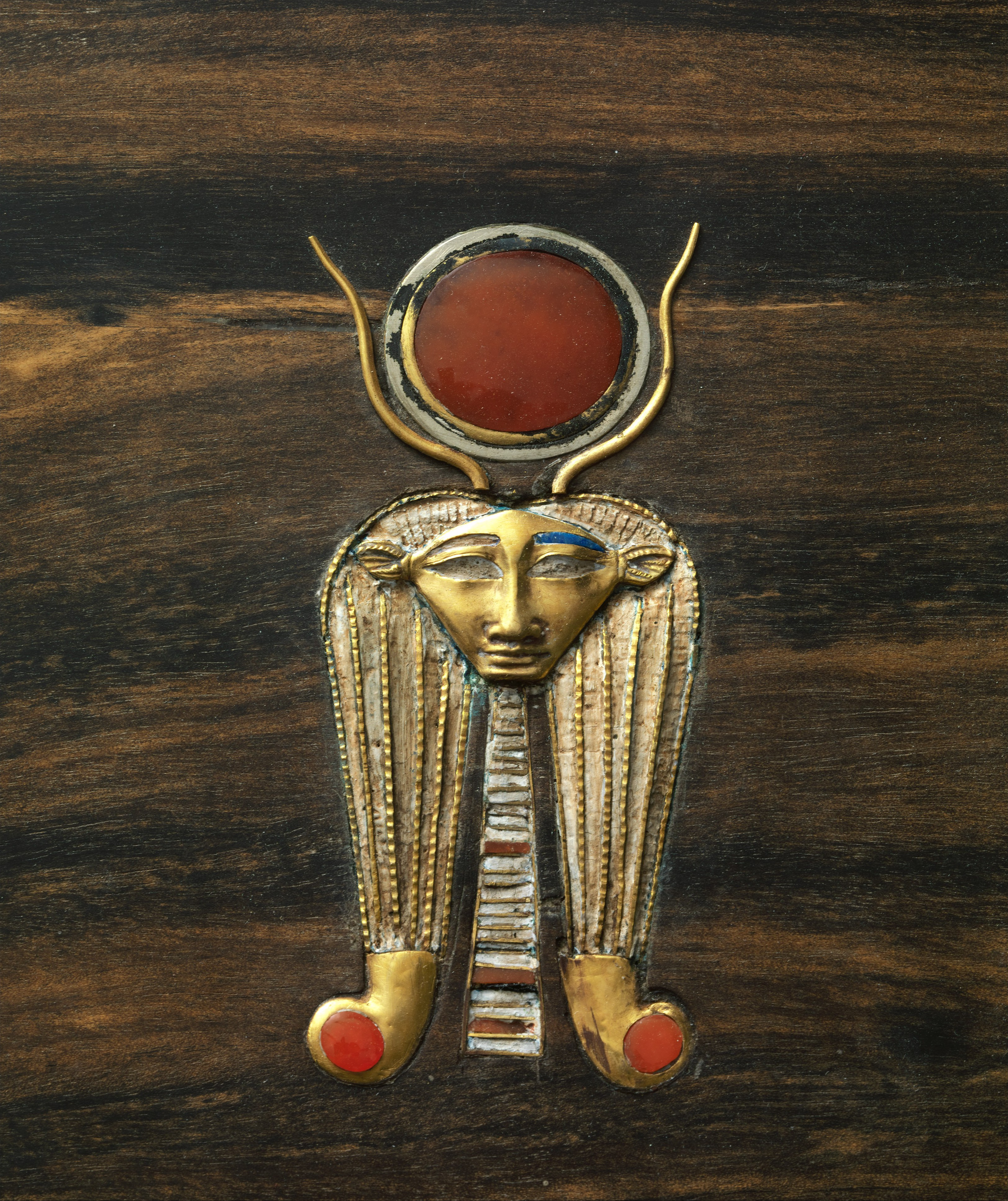
Detail of the face of one of the inlaid Hathor heads

Three further chests of Sithathoriunet
Material	Red wood
Height	unknown unknown 25.4 cm (10.0 in)
Width	15.5 cm (6.1 in); 38 cm (1 ft 3 in); 55–63 cm (1 ft 10 in – 2 ft 1 in)
Depth	15.5 cm (6.1 in); 28 cm (11 in); 36.5 cm (1 ft 2.4 in)
Identification	None

The remaining three chests cannot be properly reconstructed. The third appears to be made from red wood based on minute finds and had the gold torus moulding applied to the cosmetics chest. It may have contained obsidian jars and a kohl pot. Its position was behind the second chest as it too tumbled when the jewellery chest broke. The fourth which held the crown, a wig, the 'pectoral of Amenemhat III', and some jewellery is posited to exist principally on the premise that such valuables must have been stored somewhere. It was probably purely wooden, explaining its complete deterioration. The fifth is known to have been the largest, but also the plainest of the five chests, and is believed to have held spare wigs that have since disintegrated, thus accounting for its vacant state. It was identified from the dust and copper nails, some of which had gold heads, that had endured the millennia.

== Crown and wig ==
Crown of Sithathoriunet
Material	Gold, carnelian, lapis lazuli, faïence, garnet
Length	63.5 cm (25.0 in) (band circumference)
Height	44 cm (17 in) (full); 2.8 cm (1.1 in) (band); 21.5 cm (8.5 in) (feathers); 19.3 cm (7.6 in) (streamers); 19.7 cm (7.8 in) (streamers)
Width	19.2 cm (7.6 in) (band radius); 3.2 cm (1.3 in) (feathers)
Depth	0.04 cm (0.016 in)
Weight	0.28 kg (9.9 oz)
Symbols	Uraeus, Nymphaea plants, streamers, feathers
Present location	Egyptian Museum, Cairo
Identification	JE 44919 / CG 52641

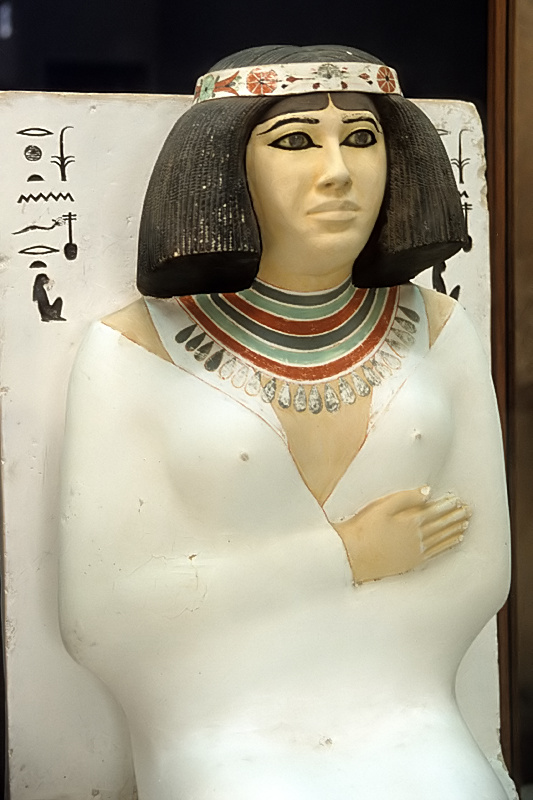
Sithathoriunet possessed a crown (Note: Sources variously refer to the artefact as a crown, diadem, circlet, or band.) consisting of a polished gold band adorned with fifteen inlaid rosettes, three streamers and two feathers, and, in its centre, an inlaid royal uraeus all principally of gold. The rosettes are cloisonné inlaid with carnelian and coloured faïence – since bleached – representing lapis lazuli and feldspar or turquoise. (Note: The descriptions of the inlays for the rosette vary, other than agreement upon the presence of carnelian. Brunton indicates that a 'blue glaze' was used probably to represent turquoise. Émile Séraphin Vernier, for the Catalogue Général of the EMC, states the inlays contained lapis lazuli and either feldspar or a green faïence to imitate it. Alix Wilkinson similarly states inlays of lapis lazuli and feldspar. Herbert Eustis Winlock, Cyril Aldred, and Carol Andrews all indicate that blue and green faïence were used without stating the stones being imitated.) The rosettes each represented four flowering Nymphaea waterlilies. (Note: The plant is generally referred to in Egyptology by the term 'lotus', though this is reserved in botany for the members of the genus Nelumbo.) They were riveted to the band with three of them having additional gold rings soldered to their base. These served as attachments for the streamers which were hinged to swing freely. In the inner rear side is a riveted tube crowned with a papyrus flower which receives the tang-like stem of the two feathers that projects high-above the wearer's head. Opposite to this sits a detachable uraeus that establishes its owner as a member of the royal family. The cobra is ajouré and cloisonné of gold inlaid with carnelian, lapis lazuli, and a once green faïence that has bleached white. The cobra's head was fashioned from a single piece of lapis lazuli and given garnet (Note: Vernier states obsidian.) encrusted eyes with a gold trim. The crown is unique, distinct from the crowns of Khenmet discovered in Dahshur. It is similar to the painted band depicted on a statue of rḫt-nsw (Note: King's acquaintance) Nofret – wife to Rahotep, son of the pharaoh Sneferu – in the Fourth Dynasty (Note: The statue of Nofret (CG 4) with its painted diadem with a floral motif from the Fourth Dynasty) and to the crowns depicted on a procession of female dancers and musicians in the tomb of Ukhhotep IV, a local governor, in Meir.

Wig
Material	Gold, hair
Width	0.9 cm (0.35 in) (large rings); 0.45 cm (0.18 in) (small rings)
Weight	1.2 kg (2 lb 10 oz) (full); 0.5 kg (1 lb 2 oz) (rings); 0.7 kg (1.5 lb) (wig)
Present location	Metropolitan Museum of Art, New York City
Identification	MET 16.1.25, 16.1.26

The crown was accompanied by a wig adorned with 1,251 gold rings of two sizes. The rings are rounded strips of gold sheet fragile enough to be crushed with little pressure. This limited possible uses for them significantly, yet Winifred Brunton proposed them as adornments in a wig. The precise arrangement of the rings on Sithathoriunet's wig is unknown owing to the latter's disintegration. One plausible format was reconstructed by Herbert Eustis Winlock with gold stripes. The Met in their current reconstruction of the wig referenced a wooden statuette head (Note: The statuette (JE 39390) originates from another nearby burial and is held by the EMC.) found in Senebtisi's pit at the pyramid of Amenemhat I in Lisht which bore a wig displaying a chequered pattern formed by the distribution of gold rings.

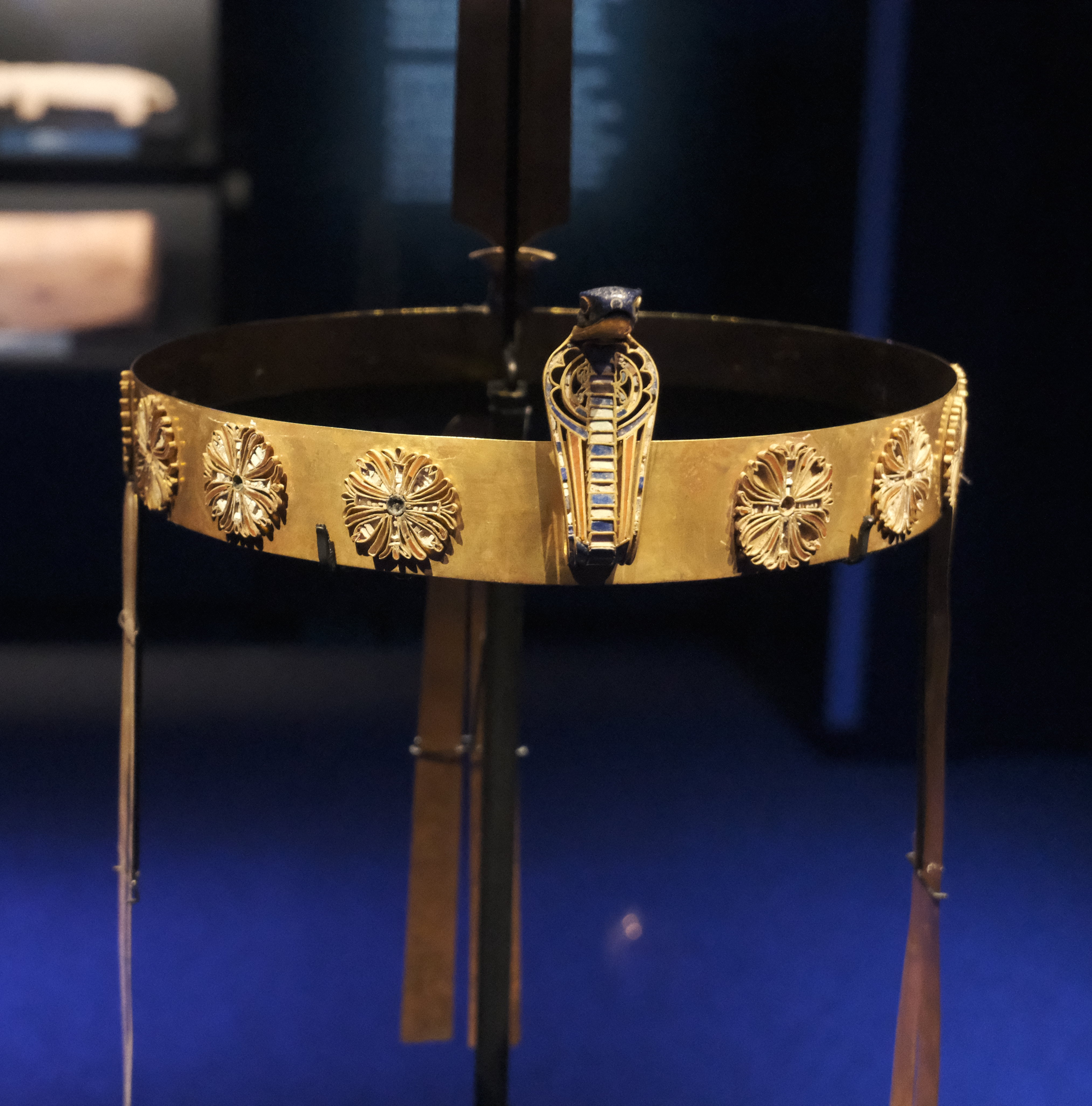
The crown is one of the few items from the cache taken for the museum in Cairo by Gaston Maspero.

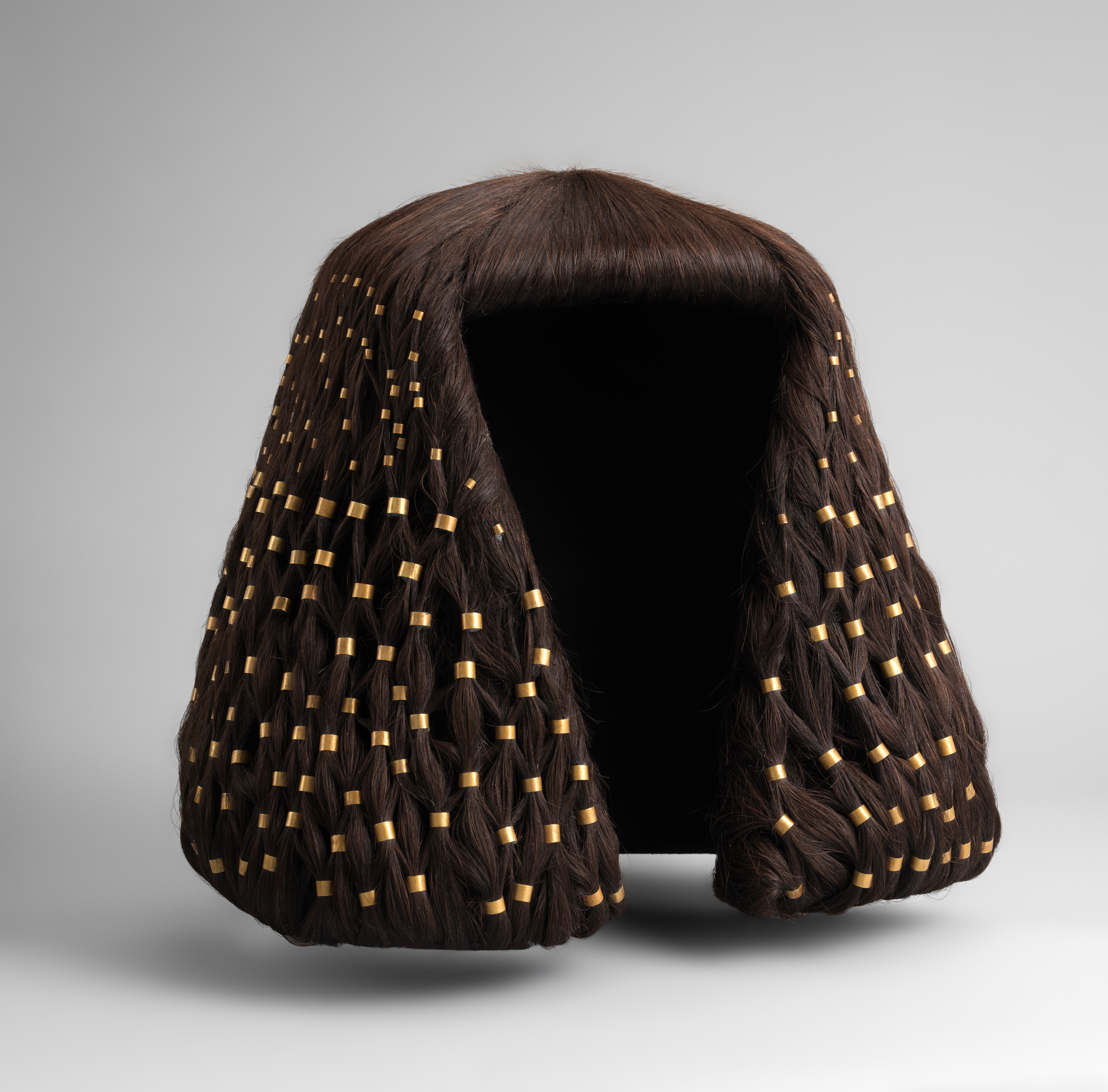
A modern wig adorned with the recovered gold rings reconstructed in a chequered pattern by The Met

== Pectorals ==
Pectoral of Senusret II
Material	Gold, turquoise, lapis lazuli, carnelian, garnet (pectoral); Gold, carnelian, lapis lazuli, feldspar, turquoise, amethyst (necklace)
Length	82 cm (32 in)
Height	4.5 cm (1.8 in)
Width	8.2 cm (3.2 in)
Depth	0.11 cm (0.043 in)
Weight	35.4 g (1.25 oz)
Writing	Egyptian hieroglyphs
Symbols	Cartouche, gods, hieroglyphs
Present location	Metropolitan Museum of Art, New York City
Identification	MET 16.1.3a, b

The 'pectoral of Senusret II' is the first of two that were gifted to Sithathoriunet and is so-called because it is designed around his praenomen Ḫꜥ-ḫpr-Rꜥ or 'Kha-kheper-re' which serves as its central motif. It came from the jewellery chest alongside a collection of beads that formed the basis of a necklace from which it hung. The pectoral comprised a thin gold plate with tiny strips of gold soldered on forming 372 cloisons on its obverse to hold 195 turquoise, 140 lapis lazuli, 35 carnelian, and 2 garnet gemstones. The artefact is widely recognised as a masterwork of the ancient Egyptian jeweller. (Note: It was described by its excavator, Guy Brunton, as an 'exquisite piece of work, which is in perfect preservation, is perhaps the finest known example of the Egyptian inlay with cut stones'. The principle restorer of the jewellery, Winlock, wrote that '[n]o more exquisitely fashioned example of goldsmith's and lapidary's work has survived from all ancient Egypt'. Aldred said that the pectorals of Sithathor and Sithathoriunet represented 'the acme of the jeweller's art in Ancient Egypt'. Wolfram Grajetzki wrote that it 'is a masterpiece of ancient Egyptian gold work'. Diana Craig Patch starts her description by stating that '[t]his spectacular pectoral is one of the finest examples of Middle Kingdom cloisonné-inlay jewellery'.)

The design is composed principally of hieroglyphs. The base bears water ripples (𓈖) representing the primordial waters. Upon this kneels the god Heh, an aspect of Nu and the sign (𓁏) for 'one million', with a tadpole (𓆐) for 'one hundred thousand' suspended from his right elbow. He clasps a pair of palm branches (𓆳) for 'years' that support the cartouche (𓍷) of the king. Flanking him are a pair of falcons, representations of Ra-Horakhty (𓱭, a combination of 𓅃 and 𓇴), oddly with blue-green solar disks, (Note: Curiously, the gems of the disks are the blue-green of turquoise rather than the traditional red of carnelian to represent the sun. They are also shaped differently with the one above the left falcon being convex and the other above the right falcon flattened. Deborah Schorsch suggests that the pectoral was altered in antiquity, but the reasons for it are unknown. Wilkinson suggests that the disks may represent the moon.) perched atop shen rings (𓍶) for 'to encircle' with a claw outstretched to clutch one of the palm branches. Pinned between the falcon's chests and the cartouche are a pair of ankhs (𓋹) representing life hanging from the tails of two uraei (𓇴), representing the Two Ladies, Nekhbet and Wadjet. The pectoral thus reads: 'May Ra-Horakhty grant eternal life and dominion to Kha-kheper-re'. (Note: Brunton states that the design 'express[es] the wish that the Sun-god may grant an eternity of years of life to the king'. Winlock translates it as 'The Sun God gives many hundreds of thousands of years' life to Khaꜥ-kheper-Rēꜥ (Senwosret II)'. Peter Dorman reads it as 'May the sun god [Ra-Harakhty] grant that Senwosret II live for hundreds of thousands of years'. The Met's curator interprets it as 'The god of the rising sun grants life and dominion over all that the sun encircles for one million one hundred thousand years [i.e., eternity] to King Khakheperre [Senwosret II]'.)

The reverse is of equal craftsmanship with its application of repoussage to form the scarab's plates and falcon's wings and meticulous, minute chasing of the falcons's feathers, cobras's scales, scarab's surface, and god's hair and clothing. The scarab has also, however, lost the middle pair of its legs. The horizontal attachments for the necklace are located behind the solar disk atop the falcon's head and have been shaped into the form of a coil. Acknowledging Brunton's assessment of the pectoral's obverse that '[t]he inlay [wa]s not so minute ... [that it] had to be viewed in general at a respectful distance', Winlock remarked of the reverse '[y]et it will bear the most intimately close inspection ... with each detail molded and chased with microscopic accuracy, [it] is perhaps even more wonderful than the obverse'.

The pectoral was hung from a necklace, apparently on a single thread, comprising alternating gold, carnelian, lapis lazuli, and feldspar drop and gold, turquoise, and amethyst (Note: Winlock's reconstruction for the spherical beads has a repeating pattern of 'turquoise, gold, gold'. The plate and description by Patch has 'turquoise, gold, amethyst'.) spherical beads. There were thirty-seven drop and thirty-eight spherical beads.

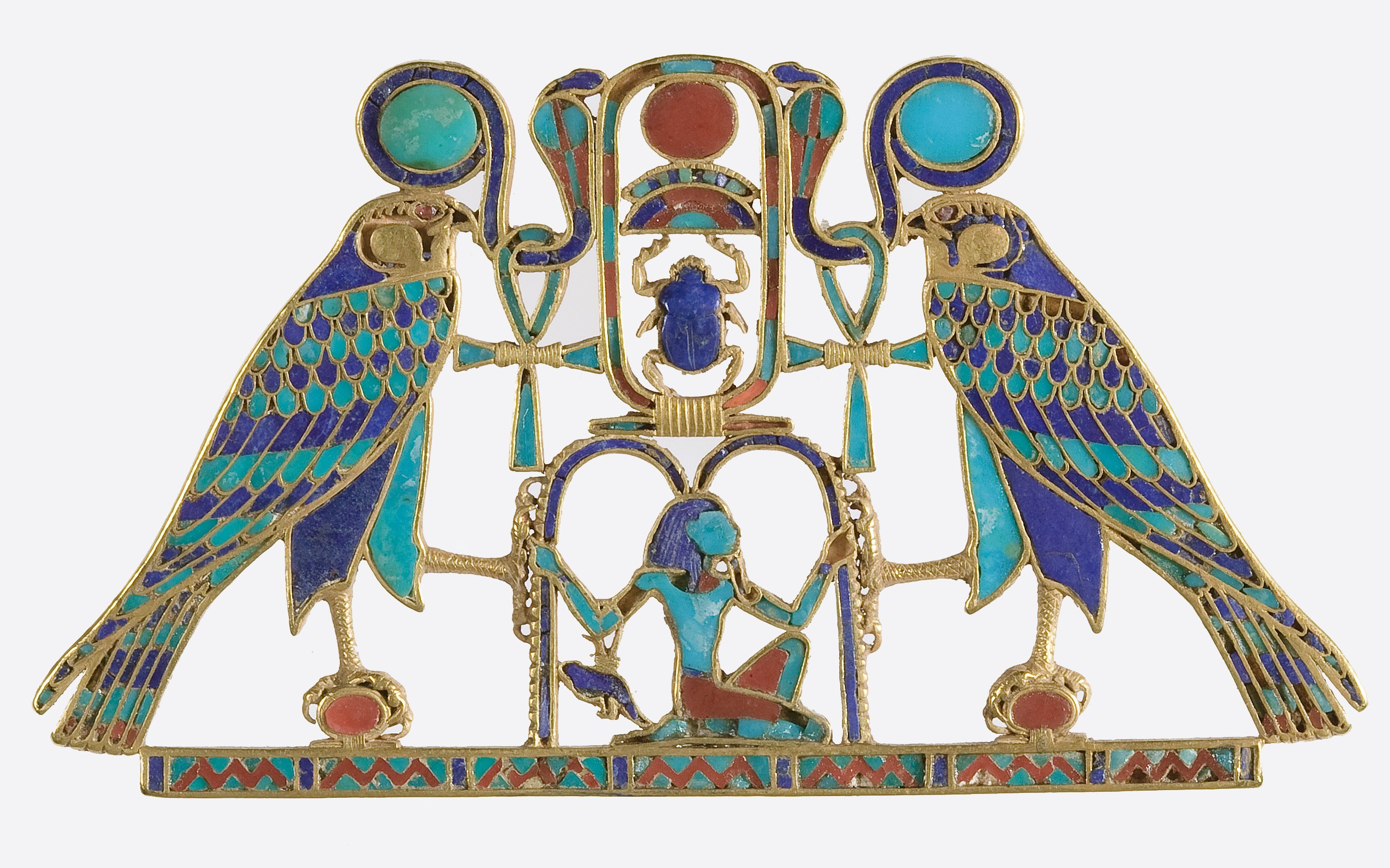
The cloisonné pectoral inlaid with 372 stones of turquoise, lapis lazuli, carnelian, and garnet

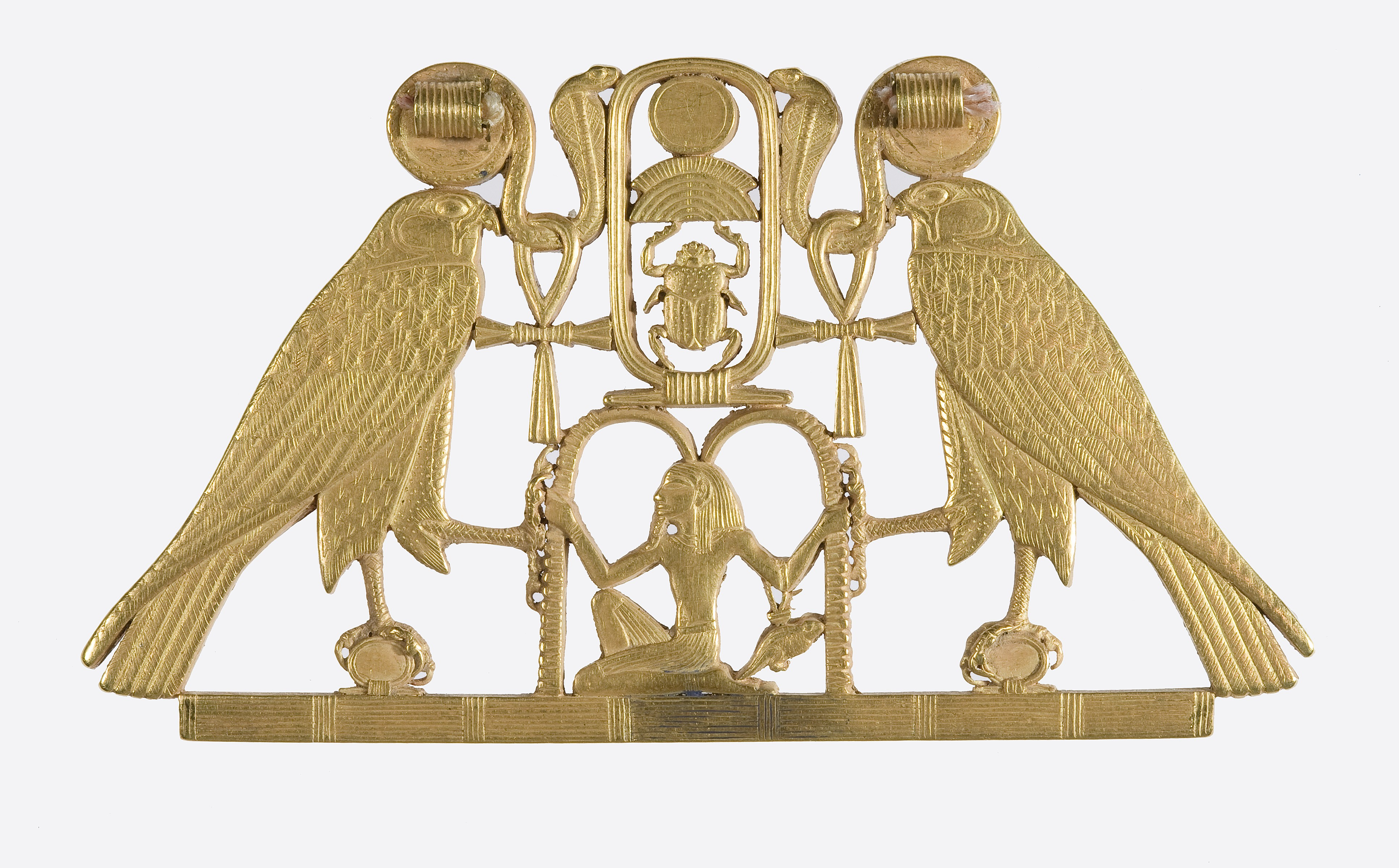
The repoussé et ciselé gold plate reverse of the pectoral with meticulous, minute detailing

Pectoral of Amenemhat III
Material	Gold, faïence, lapis lazuli, carnelian, amethyst (pectoral); Gold, carnelian, feldspar, lapis lazuli, amethyst (necklace beads)
Length	82 cm (32 in)
Height	4.7 cm (1.9 in)
Width	8.2 cm (3.2 in)
Weight	33 g (1.2 oz)
Writing	Egyptian hieroglyphs
Symbols	Cartouche, gods, hieroglyphs
Present location	Egyptian Museum, Cairo; The Met, New York City
Identification	CG 52712, MET 16.1.4

The second of the two pectorals gifted to Sithathoriunet has the same principal design but is organized around the praenomen of Amenemhat III Nỉ-mꜣꜥt-rꜥ or 'Ni-maat-re' indicating that it was commissioned during his reign. This pectoral originated from the fourth chest, with the crown and wig rings, along with the beads that belonged to its necklace.

Despite the general similarity between the two pectorals, there are a few notable differences. Foremost, there is a distinct degradation in the abilities of the craftsman that created the later pectoral. The falcons of the piece are less refined, noticeably with the claws that clutch the shen rings and the base of the falcon's tails, and the chasing of the reverse is substantially less intricate in detail, particularly about the falcon's feathers and claws, Heh's garb and tadpole suspended from his elbow, and the reed mat upon which the god kneels. There are further changes in the inlay materials used: the solar disks are red from carnelian stones, the falcon's eyes are now of amethyst, and most significantly a blue or green faïence – since bleached – was used as replacement for a semi-precious stone, probably turquoise or feldspar. The attachment 'coils' on the solar disk's reverse are here oriented vertically instead of horizontally.

The pectoral was hung from a necklace of drop and sphere shaped beads much like its predecessor. It had the same number of drop beads but a different distribution of materials among them with one greater carnelian and one fewer lapis lazuli bead compared to the older pectoral; it also had the same number of sphere beads, but here they were all of amethyst. The length of the necklaces for the two pectorals suggest that they must have hung just above the hips.

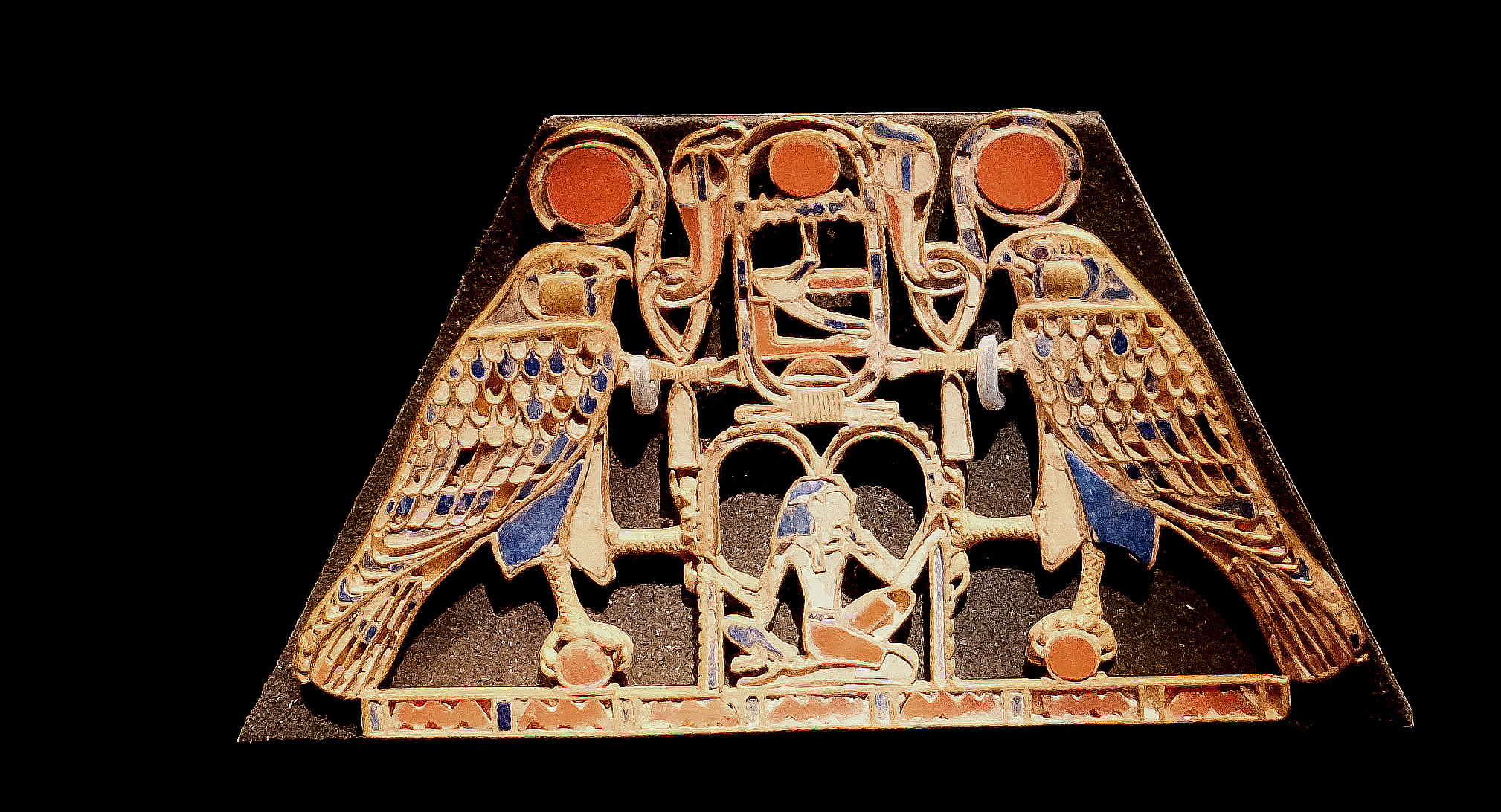
The second pectoral organized around the praenomen of Amenemhat III

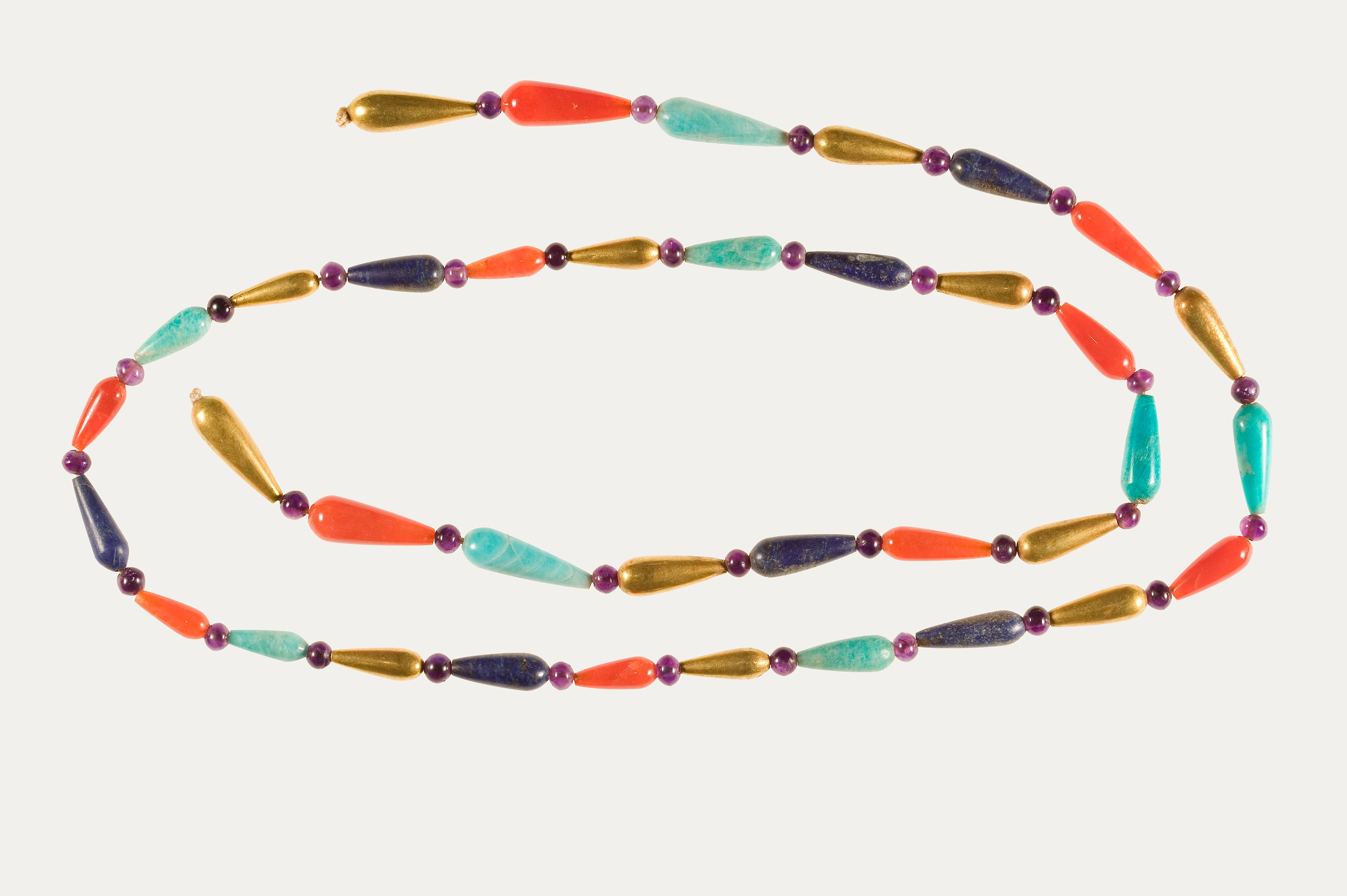
The necklace from which the second pectoral was originally hung

The pectoral is a rare article of jewellery in the Middle Kingdom with few surviving examples and only sparse appearances in Egyptian artworks. Sithathoriunet's may have adorned her body, but their intended beneficiary was the king himself, hence the presence of his name on the pectoral. In her afterlife, Sithathoriunet took on the duty of protecting the king and assisting his rebirth. This type of pectoral organized around the pharaoh's name is attested only in the period from Senusret II to Amenemhat III. The few others that have been recovered were found in Dahshur: one belonging to Sithathor, bearing the praenomen of Senusret II; and two belonging to Mereret, one bearing the praenomen Ḫꜥỉ-kꜣw-rꜥ of Senusret III and the other of Amenemhat III. The corpus of royal pectorals from the Middle Kingdom are considered to be among the finest extant examples from ancient Egypt. (Note: Wilkinson states that with them 'the ancient Egyptian artists produced some of their greatest masterpieces' and that '[t]he craftsmanship is superb and the designs at once simple and full of meaning'. Andrews says simply that '[t]hese pectorals are among the finest ever made in Egypt' and Grajetzki equally that '[t]hey are some of the finest examples of Egyptian gold work'.) They also belonged exclusively to sꜣt-nsw of the dynasty. There are a handful of non-royal examples from the period: one from el-Riqqa, one from Harageh, (Note: The fragments are held by The Met; their inventory numbers are 2014.619.9–15.) and two others of unclear provenance held in Beirut and in Eton College. They are also depicted on the daughters of Djehutyhotep, a nomarch, in his tomb in Deir el-Bersheh and on a statue of sꜣt-nsw Neferet.

== Broad jewellery set ==
Broad jewellery set
Material	Gold, carnelian, feldspar (girdle); Gold, carnelian, turquoise (broad set)
Length	84.3 cm (2 ft 9.2 in) (girdle)
Height	8 cm (3.1 in) (bracelets); 4.5 cm (1.8 in) (anklets)
Width	12.5 cm (4.9 in) (bracelets); 15.4 cm (6.1 in) (anklets); 14.5 cm (5.7 in) (wristlets)
Writing	Egyptian hieroglyphs
Symbols	Cowrie shells, acacia seeds, lions, inscriptions
Present location	Metropolitan Museum of Art, New York City
Identification	MET 16.1.5, 16.1.8, 16.1.9, 16.1.10a, 16.1.11a, 16.1.12 16.1.13

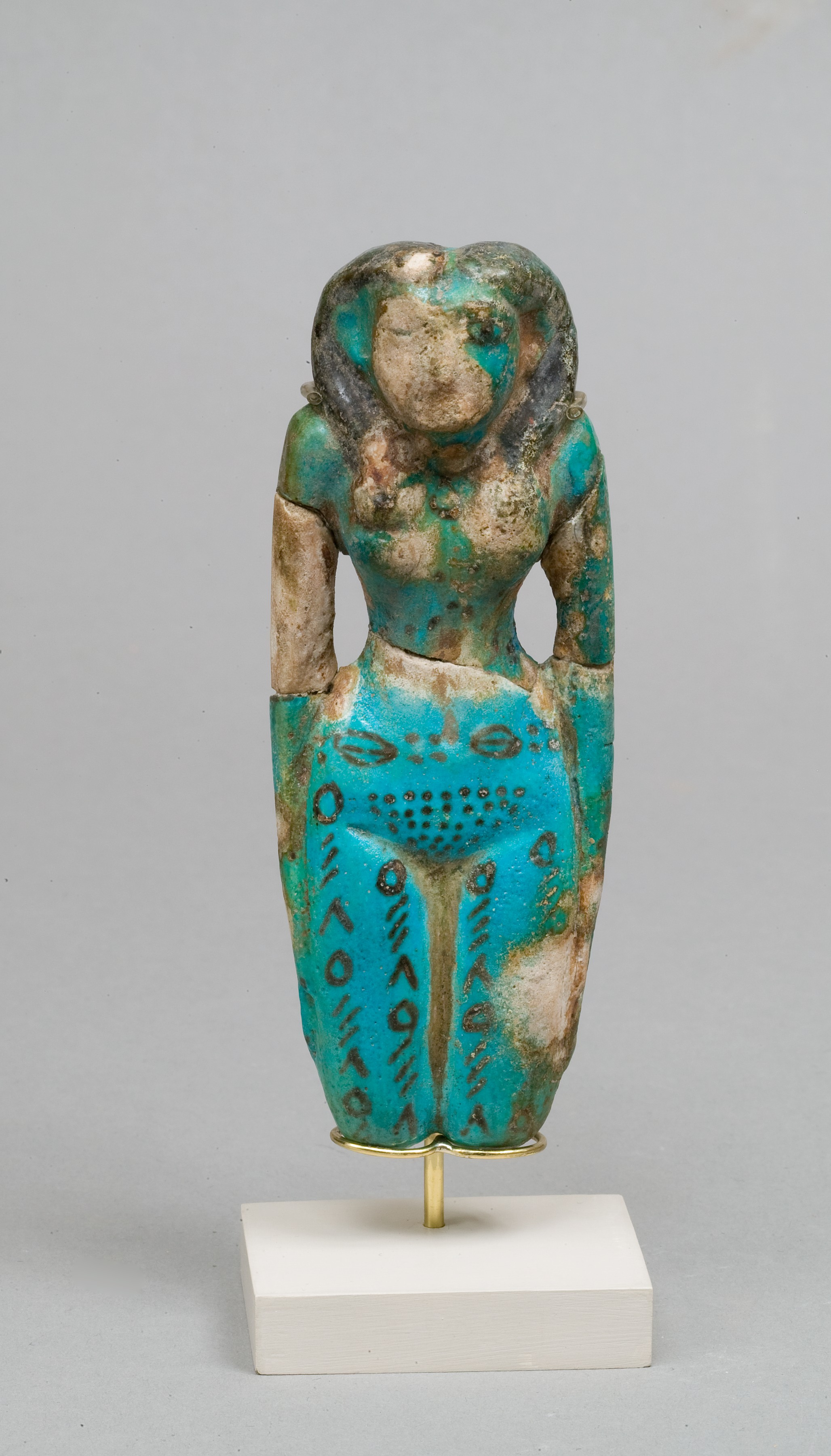
In amongst the goods of the jewellery chest of Sithathoriunet was a girdle (Note: Petrie had reconstructed this as a necklace of cowries separated by two pairs of gold acacia seeds. Winlock further connected the remaining acacia seed stones with it and developed from the combination a girdle.) composed of eight gold cowrie shells and twin strands of ninety-six acacia seed stones evenly distributed into thirty-two (Note: Only the whole set of gold beads was recovered, one seed was missing from each of the carnelian and feldspar set, though whether the loss occurred in antiquity or the modern era is unknown.) of gold, carnelian, and feldspar. (Note: William Hayes gives the feldspar seeds as turquoise, while Aldred and Andrews state that the girdle additionally had lapis lazuli seed pairs as well, though neither appears here.) Each shell was separated by six pairs of acacia seeds, though the reconstructed order is purely speculative. Seven of the shells were hollow to accommodate a handful of copper-silver alloy pellets, which chimed with the wearer as she walked or danced, while the eighth was fashioned into a tongue-and-groove clasp. A few other cowrie girdles are known from the Twelfth Dynasty. Two or three belonged to Sithathor and Mereret, the latter lady having one with large cowries like Sithathoriunet's and apparently another with much smaller shells. A fourth girdle was owned by Weret II which lacked the pellets and clasp present in other girdles. Such girdles are commonly depicted adorning figurines of nude women in the Middle and New Kingdoms, (Note: This faïence statuette (MET 08.200.18) from the late Middle Kingdom depicts a woman with a cowrie shell girdle about her hips. She also has tattoos, detailed pubic hair, and the so-called 'Hathoric hairstyle'.) but are not attested in reliefs or paintings of elite women. The cowrie shell is an amuletic image with a striking resemblance to female genitalia. Its placement on a girdle, worn about the hips, with chiming pellets indicates their purpose to enhance the sexual allure of the wearer and imbue her with elevated fertility. This is particularly supported by their appearance in artworks depicting concubines. They may also have played a role in performances for the cult of Hathor.

A pair of broad bracelets and anklets also appeared in the jewellery chest with the cowrie girdle. These were composed of small tubular beads of gold, turquoise, and carnelian separated by gold spacers and slides that framed the ends. The clasps of the bracelets are cloisonné of gold inlaid with carnelian and two coloured faïence imitating turquoise, which has since bleached white, and lapis lazuli, that remains an Egyptian blue. The cloisons frame an inscription for Amenemhat III that reads nṯr nfr nb tꜣwy Nỉ-mꜣꜥt-rꜥ dỉ ꜥnḫ meaning 'the good god, lord of the Two Lands, Ni-maat-re, given life'. Mereret had a similar pair of bracelets gifted to her by Amenemhat III, others include Ita's, Sithathor's, and Weret II's with clasps inscribed with a ḏd for 'enduring', and Khenmet's with sꜣ for 'protection'. Two near identical anklet pairs belonged to Ita and Khenmet. Two others belonged to Sithathor and Mereret with similar designs and a third to Senebtisi that was evidently made for her burial.

The reconstruction of these two item pairs is particularly complicated, owing to their being made principally from minute, fragile beads that were scattered once the organic threads that originally bound them had disintegrated, and has involved repeated revisions. The original reconstruction by the excavating team was rejected by Winlock for bearing an unattested design with voids through which flesh showed, inconsistently arranging the spacers, and assembling the bracelets and anklets with circumferences too similar to be plausible for the wrists and ankles. The revised reconstruction by Winlock also went through many iterations.

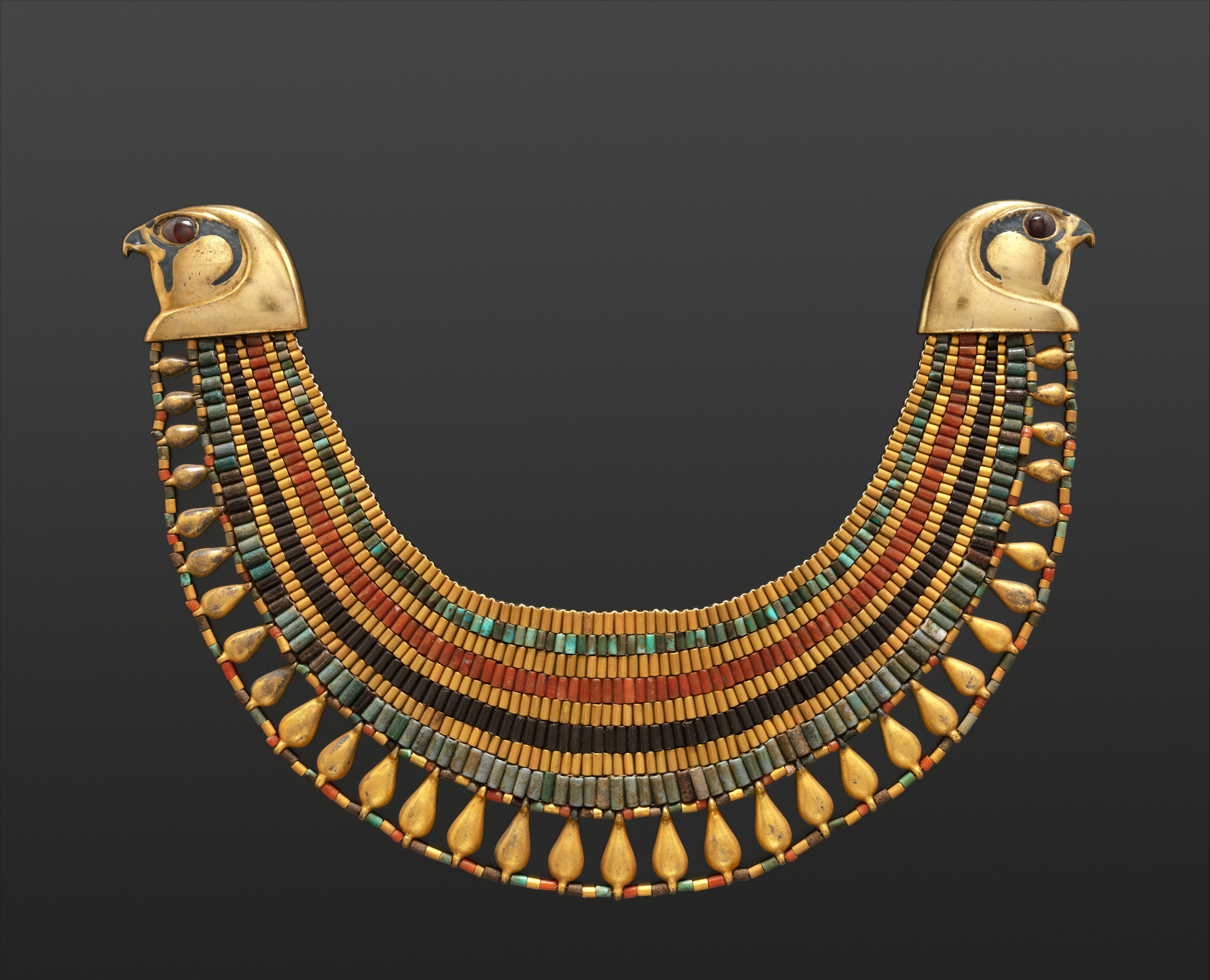
Two pairs of wristlets each with four gold recumbent lions, probably representations of the god Shu and goddess Tefnut, were also recovered. The lions of the first bracelet pair have two thread holes and have been reconstructed on a bracelet of carnelian, gold, and turquoise beads. (Note: Both bracelet pairs were originally reconstructed with these beads, though the second bracelet is now assigned to the second jewellery set and has amethyst beads.) This bracelet pair is fastened with square knot clasps. Such recumbent lions from wristlets were also among the possessions of Sithathor, Mereret, and Weret II. These jewellery pieces formed the first set from the chest, which omits a typically expected broad collar. (Note: This broad collar (MET 08.200.30) belonging to Senebtisi of the late Twelfth Dynasty to early Thirteenth Dynasty bears a similar colour scheme to the broad jewellery of Sithathoriunet.)

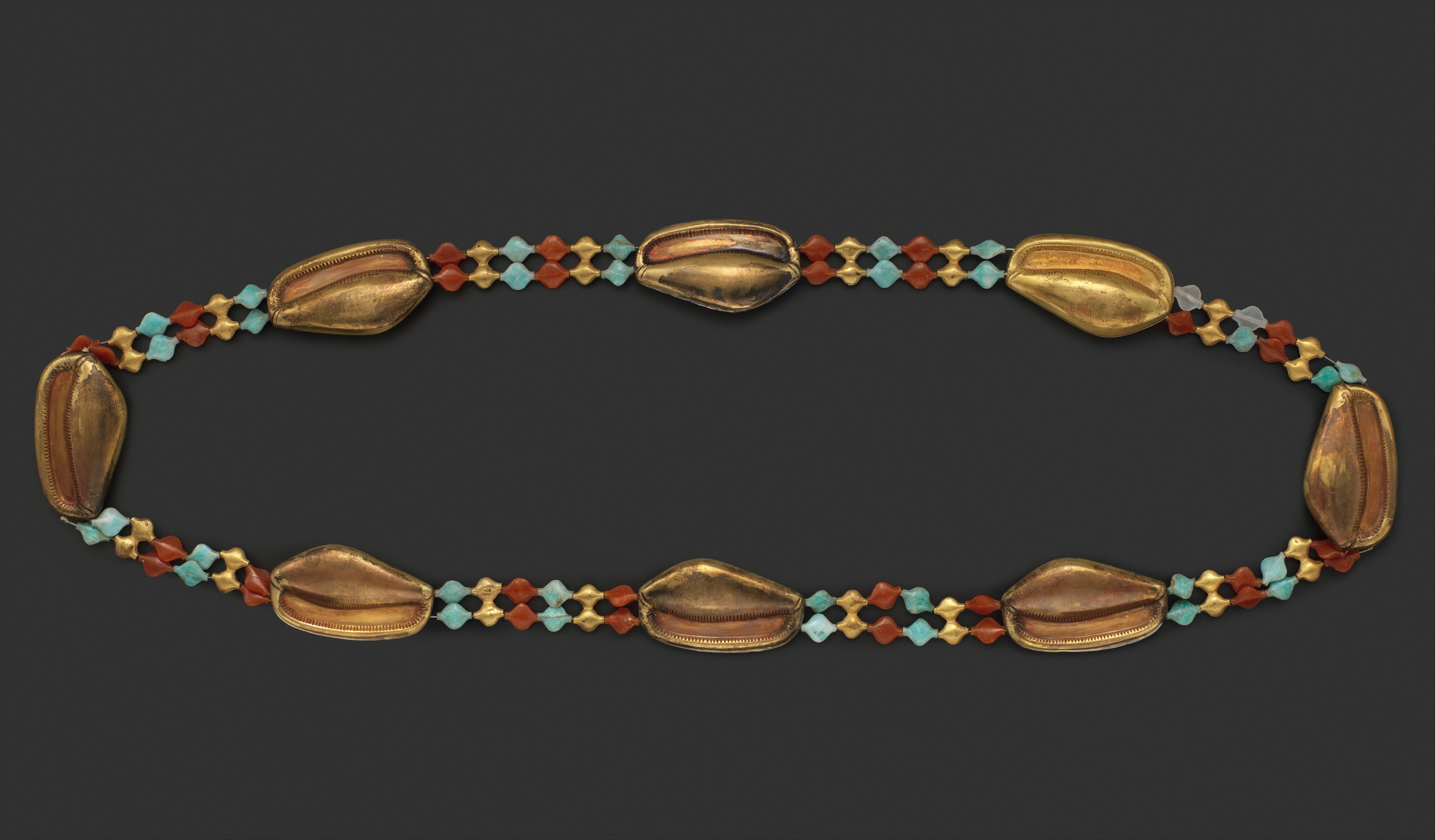
The pellets in this cowrie shell girdle jingled brightly as Sithathoriunet walked and danced.

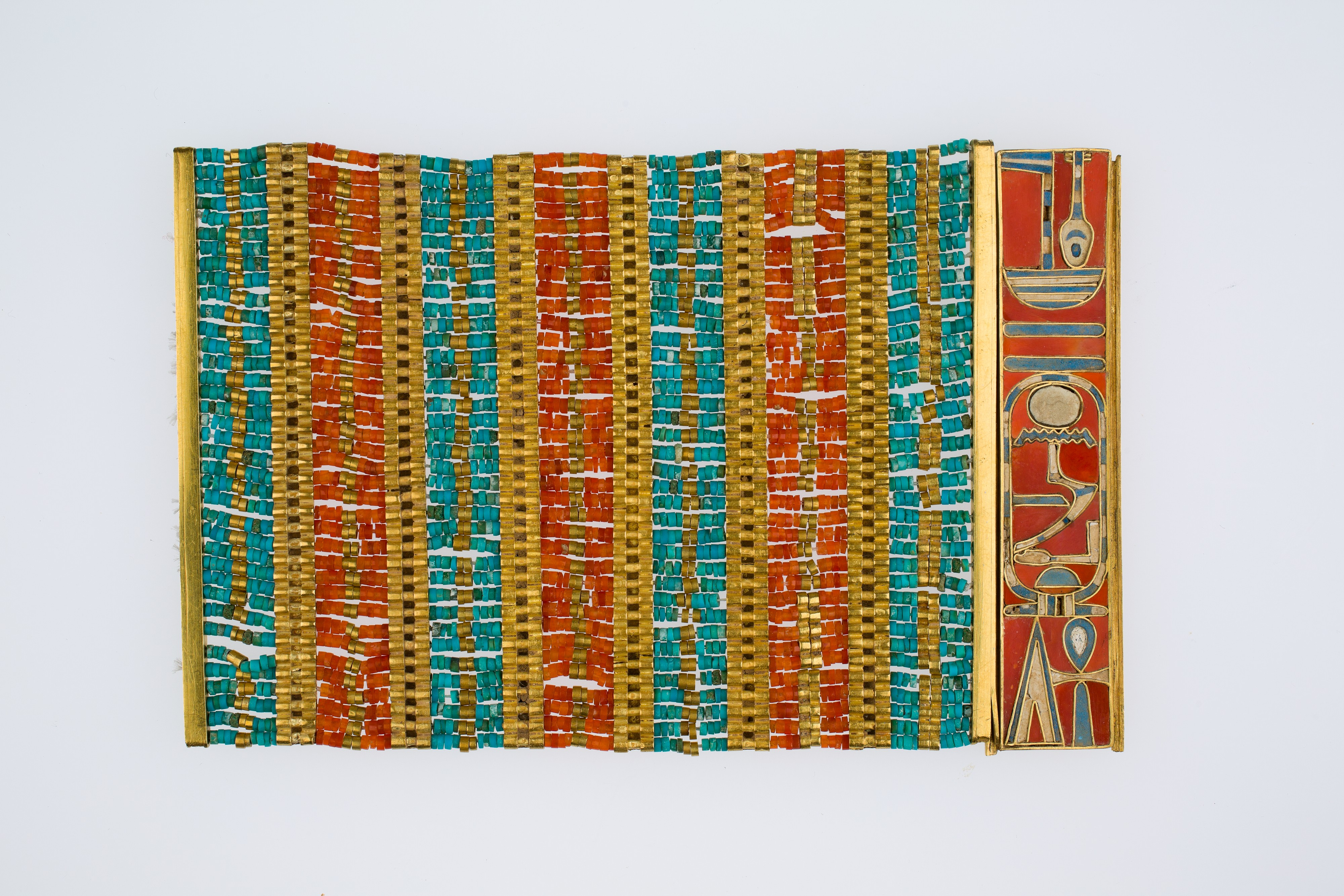
nṯr nfr nb tꜣwy nỉ-mꜣꜥt-rꜥ dỉ ꜥnḫ
'The good god, lord of the Two Lands, Ni-Maat-Re, given life'

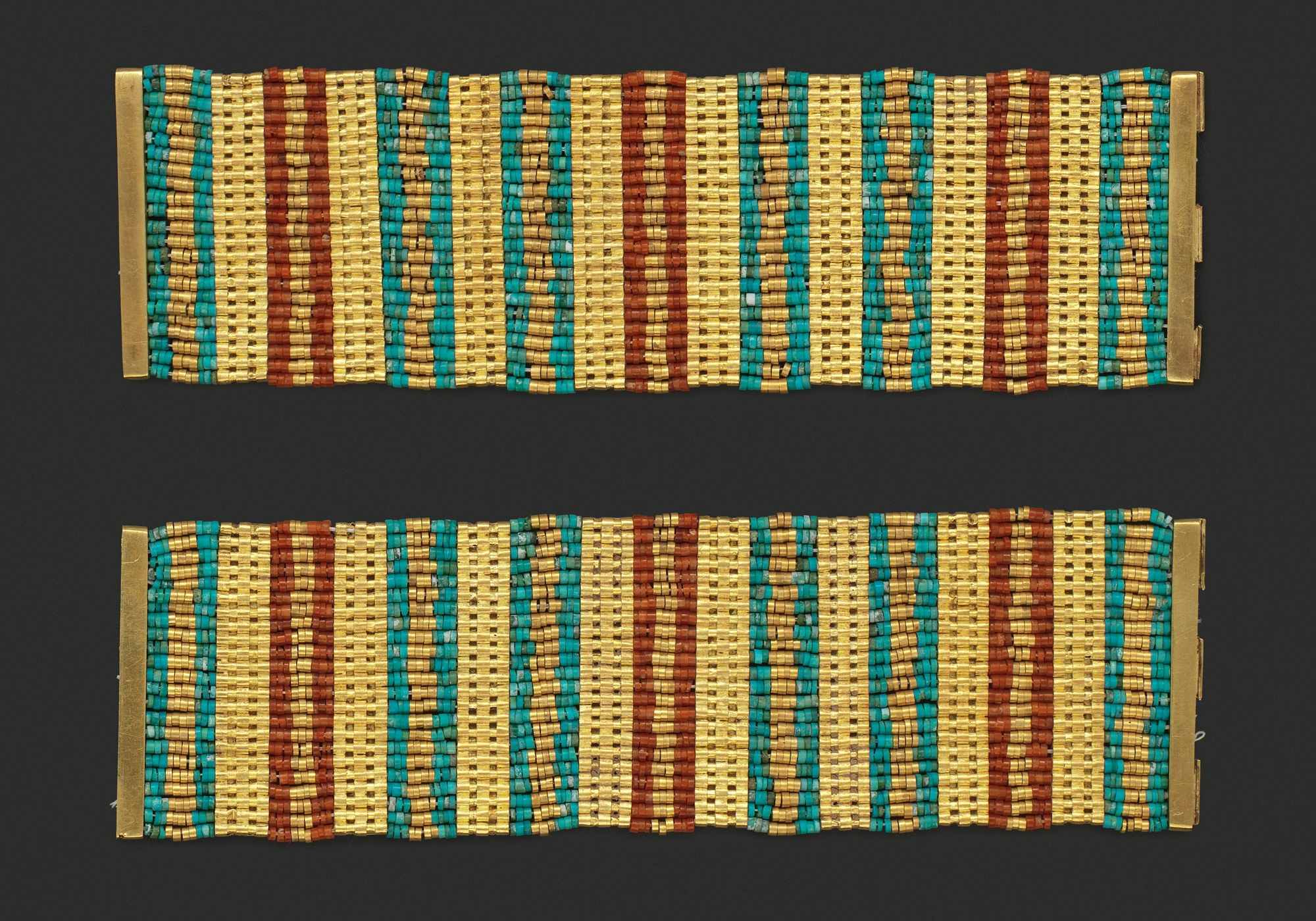
These broad anklets were assembled from thousands of minute gold, carnelian, and turquoise beads.

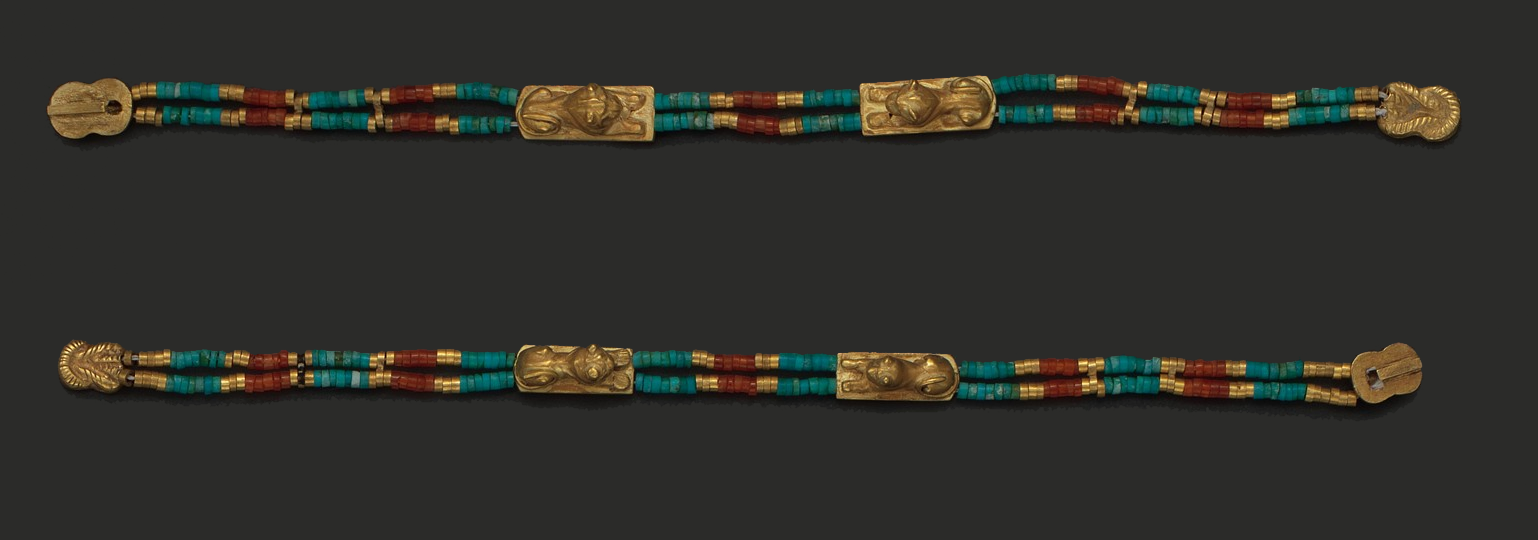
The recumbent lions of these wristlets probably represented the two Egyptian gods of Shu and Tefnut.

== Feline-themed jewellery set ==
Feline-themed jewellery set
Material	Gold, amethyst
Length	81 cm (2 ft 8 in) (girdle)
Width	14.2 cm (5.6 in) (anklet); 15 cm (5.9 in) (anklet); 11.7 cm (4.6 in) (wristlet); 14.5 cm (5.7 in) (wristlet)
Symbols	Feline-heads, lions, claws, square knots,
Present location	Metropolitan Museum of Art, New York City
Identification	MET 16.1.6, 16.1.7a, b, 16.1.14a, 16.1.15a

Sithathoriunet possessed a second girdle which was stored in the jewellery chest and belonged to a feline-themed jewellery set. The girdle (Note: Petrie had reconstructed this to be a necklace comprising only the large and small feline-heads which he identified as belonging to lions. Winlock proposed both that the necklace should be a girdle and that the feline-heads were of leopards owing to their lack of a mane.) was composed of seven large, gold, opposite-facing feline-heads with fourteen small, gold, opposite-facing leopard-head pairs interspersed on two strands of 140 evenly distributed amethyst beads in groups of ten. Six of the large feline-heads were hollow to accommodate diorite pellets while the seventh was fashioned into a tongue-and-groove clasp. As with the cowrie girdle, these must have chimed, here with a sharp ring, as the wearer walked or danced. The relative dating of the girdle is uncertain: Brunton believed it to date to Senusret II's reign owing to the superior workmanship of the heads compared to the cowrie shells; Cyril Aldred proposes it should be assigned to a later reign. A very similar girdle with eight opposite-facing feline-heads was owned by Mereret.

The significance of the feline-heads is subject to interpretation. They may have represented the hieroglyphs for pḥty meaning 'strength', though this was written with two leopard-heads facing the same direction. They might have served an apotropaic function to protect the wearer or as representations of Shu and Tefnut derived from a typical presentation where they face opposite directions with the sun rising between them. They may depict the eye of Ra often represented as a companion goddess to Ra that protected him from his foes during his daily journey. They may otherwise have been symbols of rejuvenation and fertility.

The set was completed by a pair of recumbent lion wristlets and claw anklets. (Note: The anklets were originally reconstructed as a claw necklace. Claw anklets are attested in relief, such as from the tomb of a nomarch, Wahka II, in Qaw el-Kebir.) The lions of the wristlets and the claws of the anklets were gold. The wristlets had a single thread, while the anklets featured double threads, each of which was fitted with gold and amethyst beads. The anklets were additionally fastened with a square knot clasp. This set of jewellery was probably worn during ceremonial performances. The recumbent lions of the wristlets face each other in the reconstruction, but there is no justification for this in preference to them facing opposite directions. Two other identical pairs of claw anklets were owned by Sithathor and Mereret; two more in different styles were owned by Khenmet and Weret II.

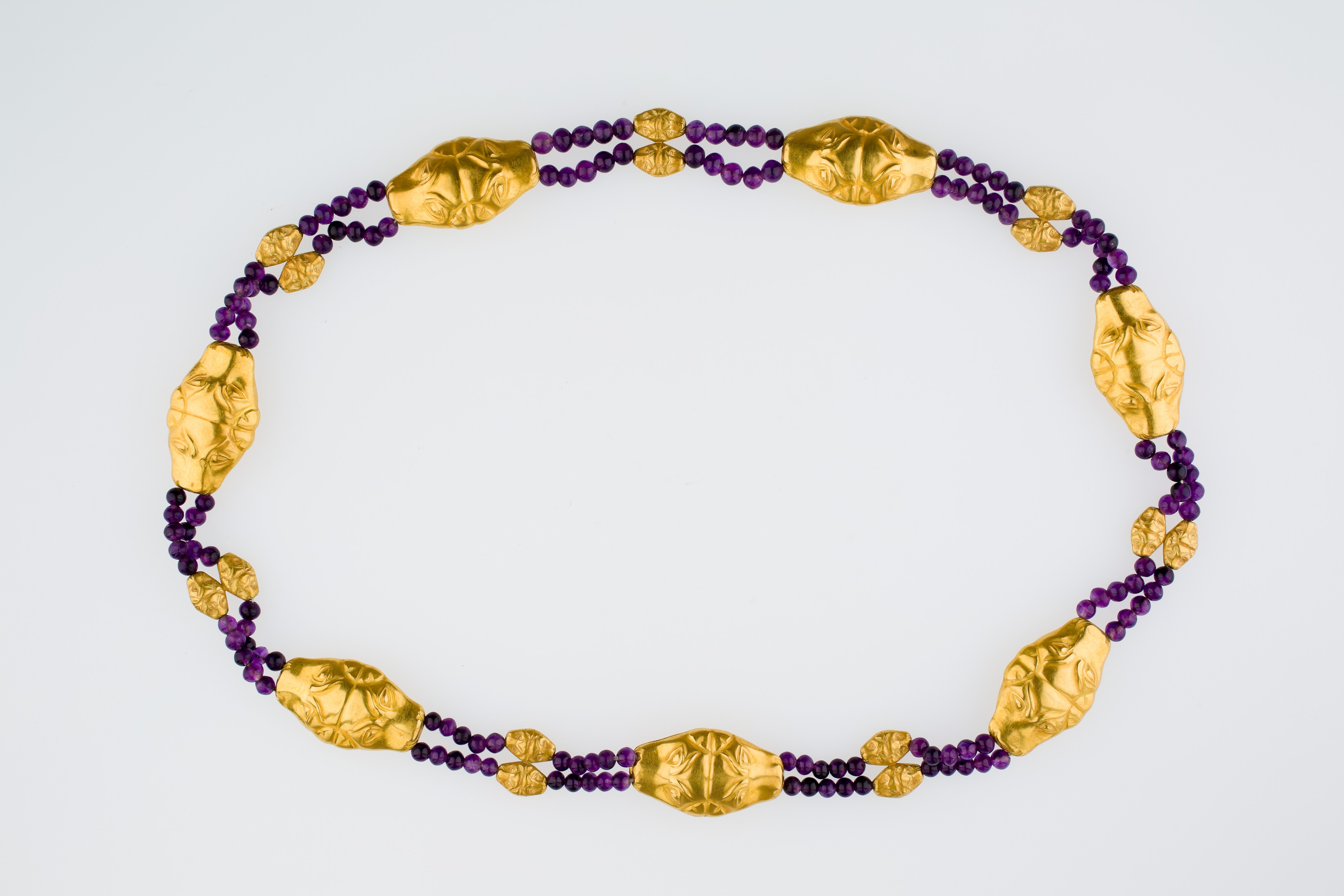
The leopard head girdle of the second ritual jewellery set

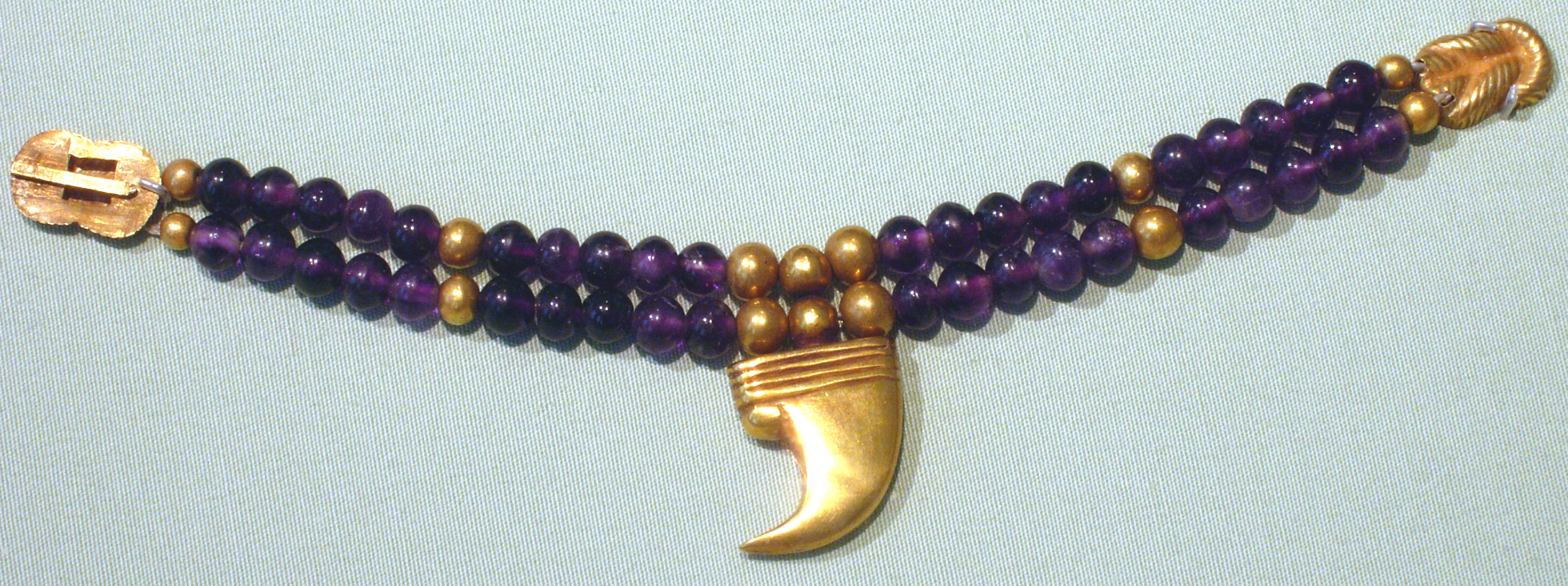
The feline claw anklet with its double strands of gold and amethyst beads

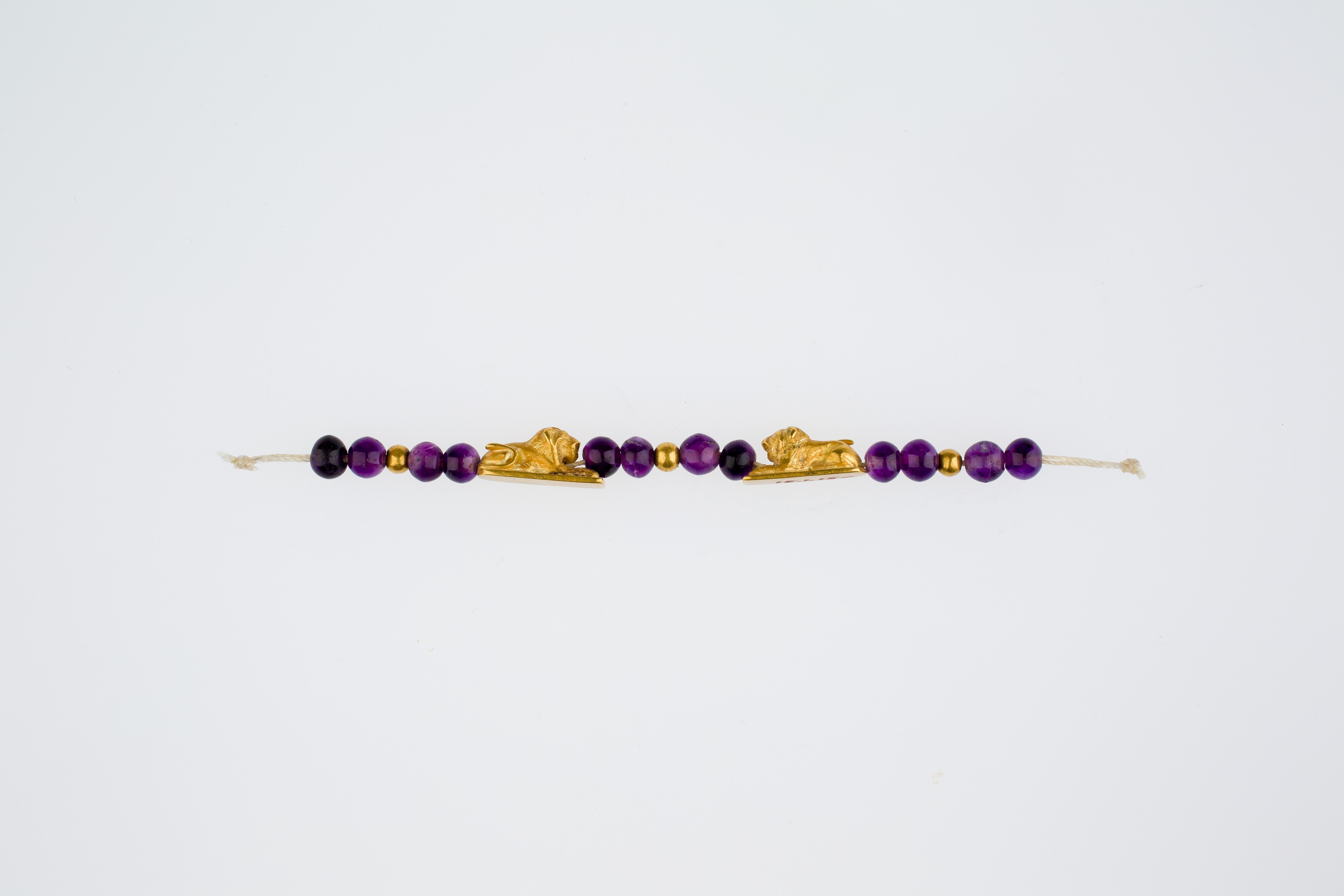
One of the wristlets with amethyst beads and gold recumbent lions

== Toiletries ==
Mirror of Sithathoriunet
Material	Silver, obsidian, gold, carnelian, lapis lazuli, faïence, electrum
Height	28 cm (11 in); 12.6 cm (5.0 in) (reflector); 1.4 cm (0.55 in) (umbel); 2.9 cm (1.1 in) (head); 9.7 cm (3.8 in) (handle)
Width	14.1 cm (5.6 in) (reflector); 8.7 cm (3.4 in) (umbel); 6.3 cm (2.5 in) (head); 2.4 cm (0.94 in) (handle)
Weight	780 g (28 oz)
Symbols	Papyrus plant, Hathor head
Present location	Egyptian Museum, Cairo
Identification	JE 44920 / CG 52663

Sithathoriunet's mirror is a substantially corroded silver reflector resting upon an elaborately decorated handle. The handle is fashioned into the form of an obsidian papyrus plant with a two-sided Hathor head interposed between its culm and involucre. The base is inlaid with carnelian, gold, and lapis lazuli in the form of the plant's leaves from which rises the obsidian culm. Four gold bands inlaid with carnelian, lapis lazuli, and a once green – now white – faïence emulating turquoise form a collar connecting the plant and Hathor head. The faces are gold with inlaid lapis lazuli brows, silver eyelids, and white stone eyeballs with crystal pupils. She has two gold cow ears soldered to the side of each face which were cire perdue cast and soldered together to form the head. From her head sprouts the papyrus's curved obsidian umbel with an electrum plate representing flower clusters. The goddess's presence bestowed upon Sithathoriunet an assurance of 'youth, beauty, and pleasure' and cast her protection over the princess. Mirrors are a particularly common grave good find in the Middle Kingdom. They are most often copper, but may also be bronze, gold, or – rarest and most expensive of all for the period – silver. Sithathor also owned a mirror and Mereret between three and five. (Note: de Morgan and Brunton indicate five, Grajetzki lists four, and Winlock states at least three.) The ornamentation of the mirror with Hathor heads was an Eleventh Dynasty innovation that retained cultural relevance for centuries.

Toiletries
Material	Gold, bronze (razors); Bronze (knives); Sandstone (whetstones); Silver (shen dish)
Length	17 cm (6.7 in) (razors); 12 cm (4.7 in) (knives); 8.3 cm (3.3 in) (whetstone); 7.8 cm (3.1 in) (whetstone); 3.4 cm (1.3 in) (shen dish)
Width	1.5 cm (0.59 in) (whetstone); 1.2 cm (0.47 in) (whetstone); 3.5 cm (1.4 in) (shen dish)
Depth	1.0 cm (0.39 in) (whetstone); 0.7 cm (0.28 in) (whetstone); 0.5 cm (0.20 in) (shen dish)
Weight	175–190 g (6.2–6.7 oz) (razors)
Present location	Metropolitan Museum of Art, New York City
Identification	MET 16.1.21, 16.1.27, 16.1.28, 16.1.29a, b, 16.1.30a, b, 16.1.31, 16.1.32

Accompanying the mirror were the remaining toiletries comprising two razors with gold handles and bronze blades, two knives with no handles and bronze blades that have been irreparably corroded, two white sandstone whetstones that came with the razors to form a shaving set, and one small concave silver dish formed into a shen (𓍶) ring.

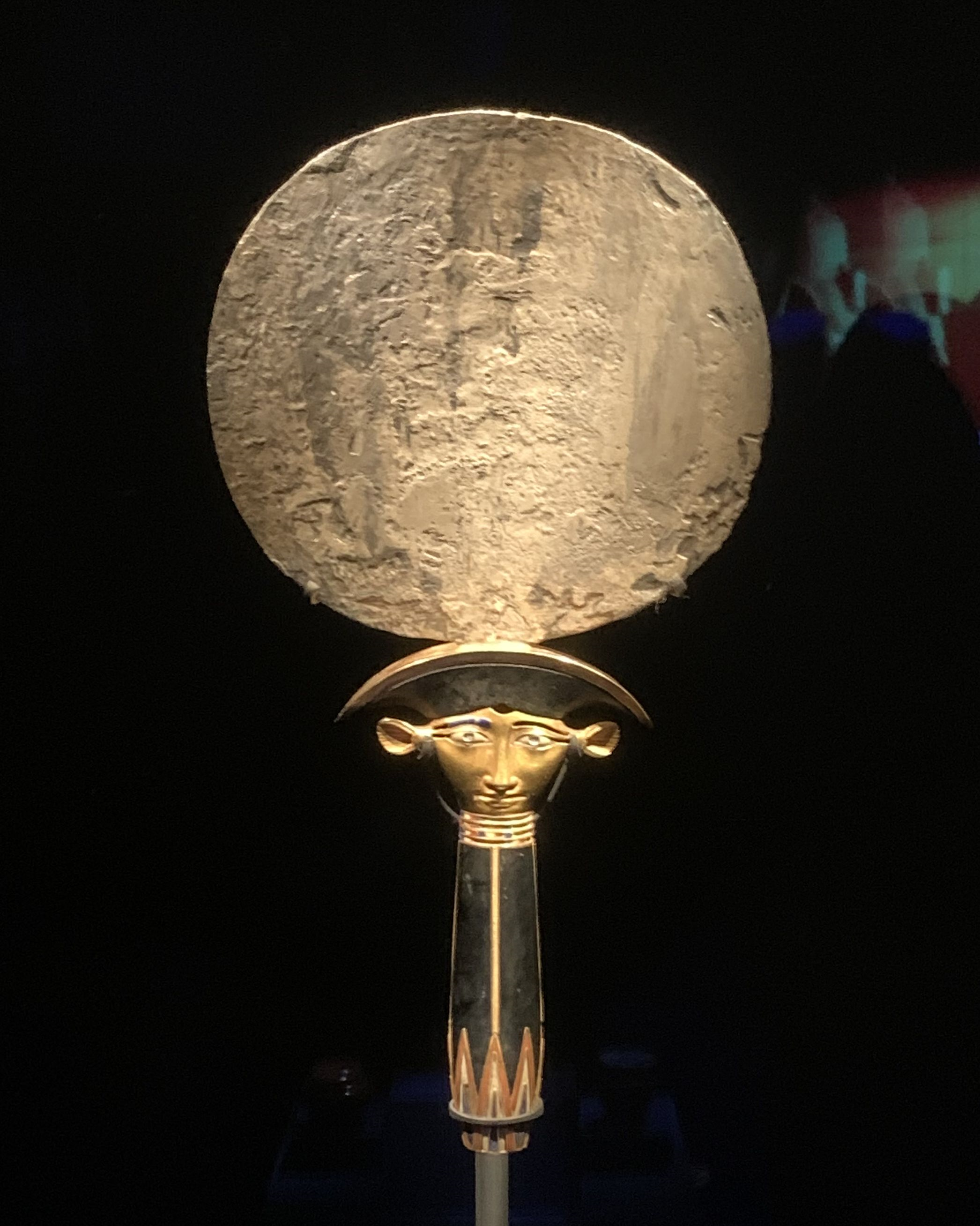
Sithathoriunet's silver mirror and obsidian handle

== Jars ==
Ointment jars
Material	Calcite; Obsidian, gold
Height	9.3–9.7 cm (3.7–3.8 in); 8.6 cm (3.4 in); 2.8 cm (1.1 in)
Width	6–7 cm (2.4–2.8 in); 6.7 cm (2.6 in); 4 cm (1.6 in)
Present location	Metropolitan Museum of Art, New York
Identification	MET 16.1.33a, b, 16.1.34a, b, 16.1.35a, b, 16.1.36a, b, 16.1.37a, b, 16.1.38a, b, 16.1.39a, b, 16.1.40a, b, 16.1.41a, b, 16.1.42a, b, 16.1.43a, b, 16.1.44a, b

The cosmetics chest held a set of eight calcite ointment jars that originally held different aromatic oils. The first seven presumably carried the 'seven sacred oils': ḥknw, nẖnm, sṯy-ḥb, sfṯ, twꜣwt, ḥꜣtt-ṯḥnw, and ḥꜣtt-ꜥš. The eighth contained an unrelated unguent such as a sweet oil or myrrh. The jars were standard in their design with a beaker shape and flat lid that had been devised as early as the late Predynastic period. Two of the jars still retained a gum resin of pinkish hue that had dried out inside the recess. The dried residue gives further evidence of the placement of the cosmetics chest atop the jewellery chest as it has left markings within the jars indicating that they stood on a slope. Ointment jars were typical of Middle Kingdom burials and are well-attested: Four sets of eight inscribed oil jars were owned by Ita, Khenmet, Itaweret, and Sithathormeryt; ten oil jars by Neferuptah, daughter of Amenemhat III; seven oil jars and a kohl pot by Nubhoteptikhered; and two sets of six and seven by Sithathor and Mereret respectively which did not belong to ritual sets like the others.

The third chest, that sat behind the cosmetics chest, apparently held a set of three obsidian and gold cosmetics jars alongside an obsidian and gold kohl pot. The obsidian jars are of the same form as the calcite jars though slightly shorter and wider and additionally have gold trimming around jar and lid rims. The jars held aromatic unguents whilst the kohl pot contained eye powder. The powder was applied to the eyes with a small, bulbously-ended stick which was not discovered in the cache. The jars and pot were analysed for their contents. One jar contained rouge composed of iron oxide and organic matter, including ochre to obtain a red colour. The other two contained perfumes composed in one instance of a gum resin and fragments of aromatic wood and in the other pure resin. The kohl pot contained iron oxide, possibly black, mixed with earth. Typical sources for eye-shadow were ground galena to create msdmt, a black eye-shadow, or ground malachite to create wꜣḏw, a green one. Winlock notes that the craftsman precisely turned the objects such that no deviation in their dimensions exceeds 1 mm (0.039 in).

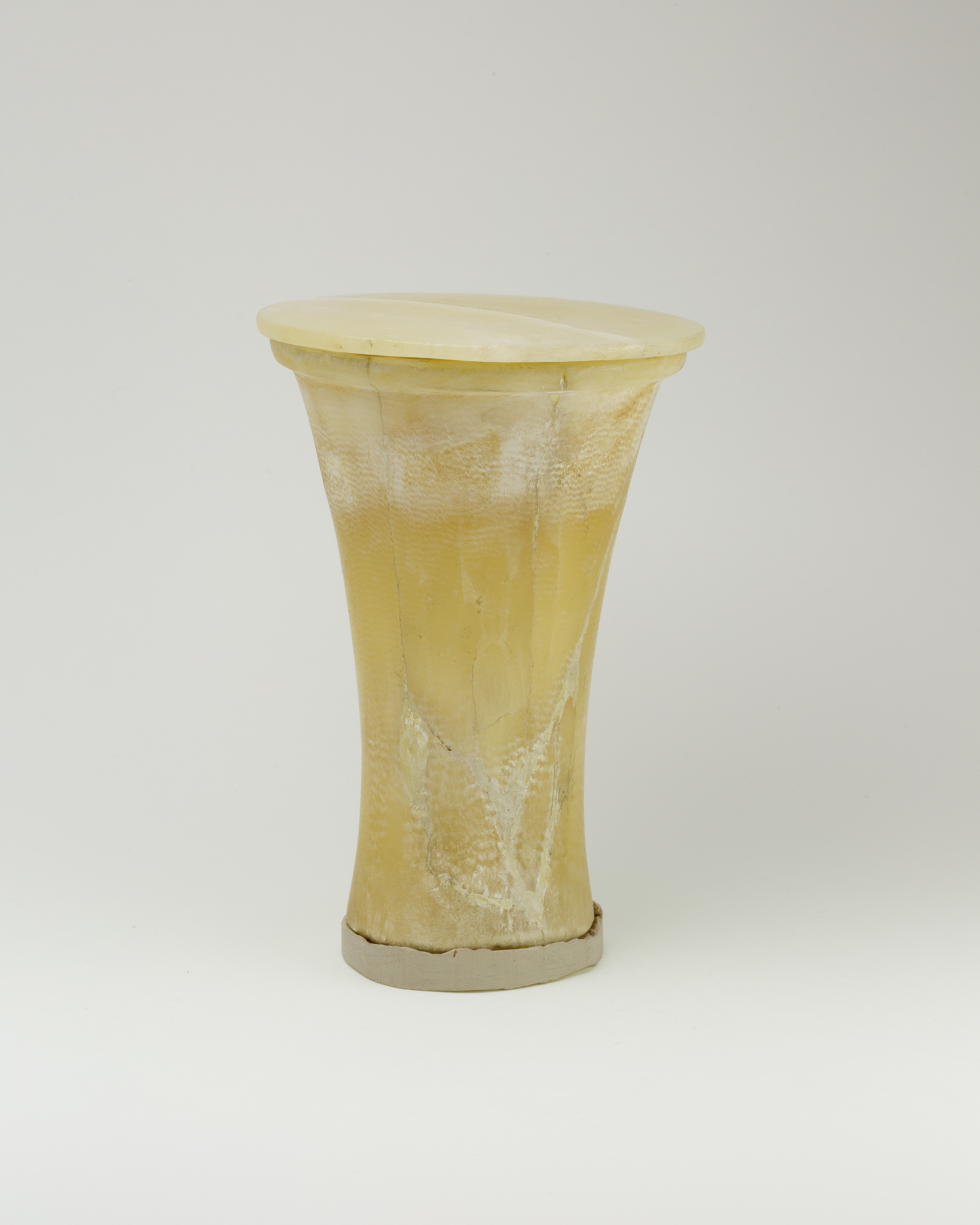
A calcite jar that contained a sacred oil or unguent

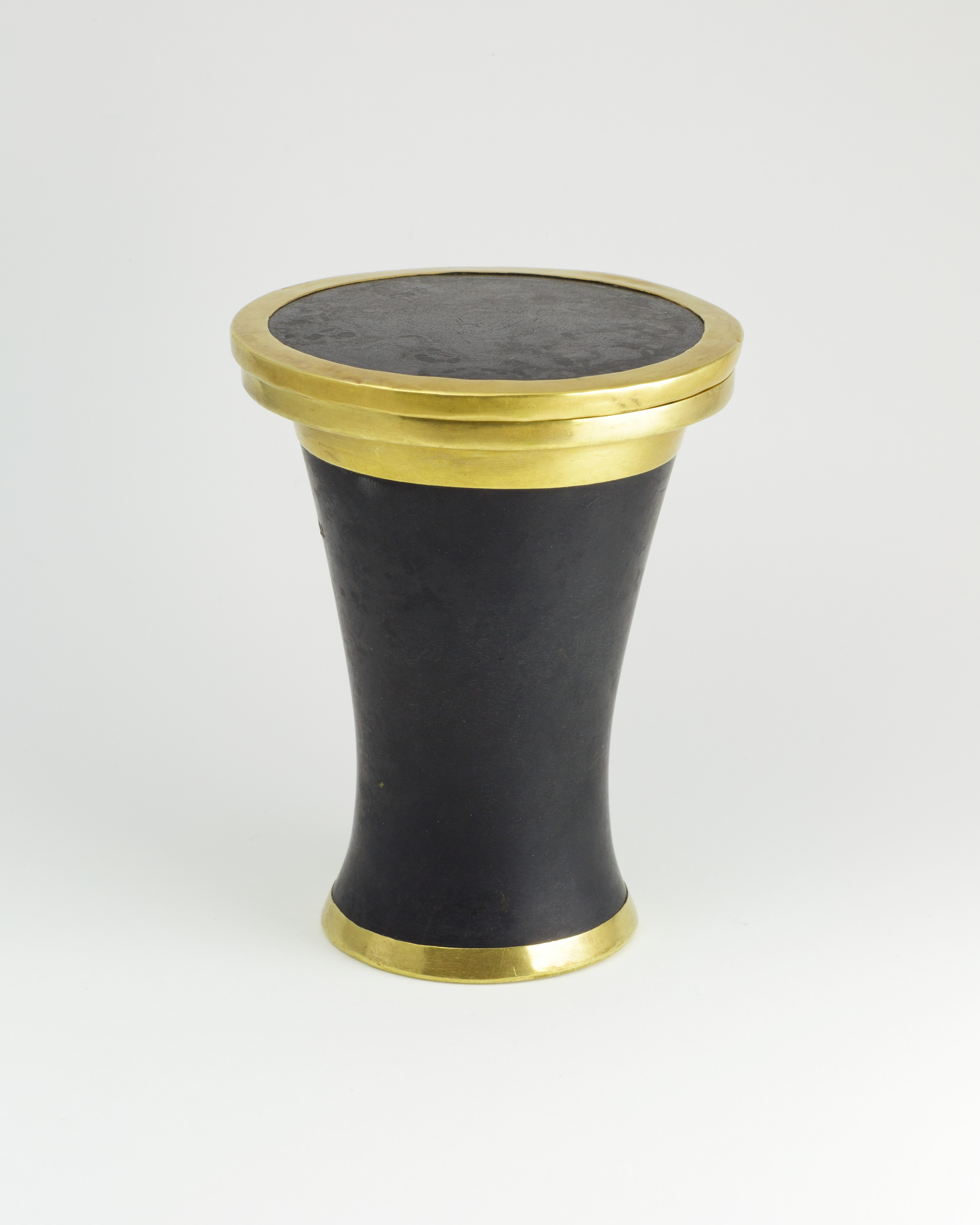
An obsidian and gold jar that held rouge or a perfume for the princess

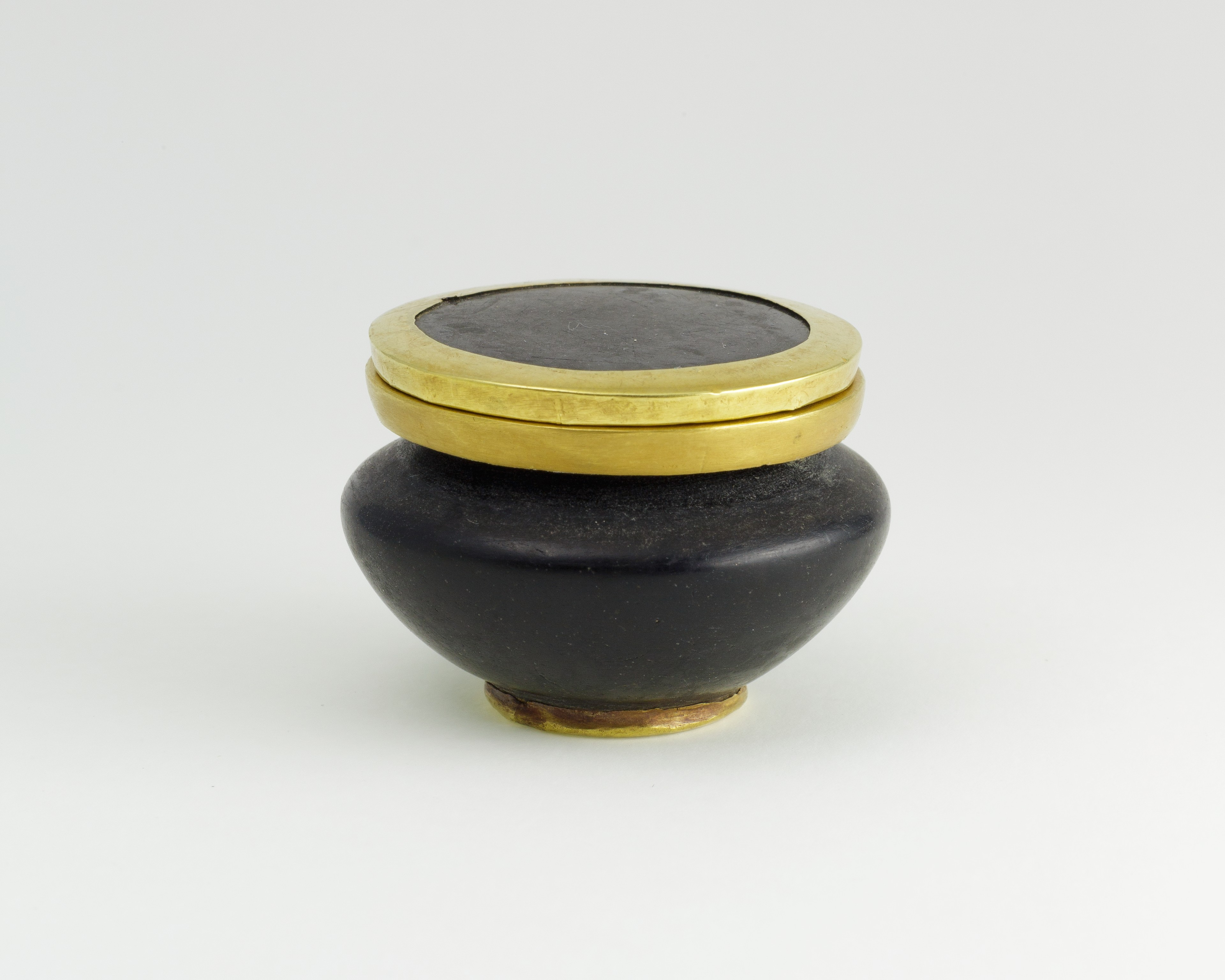
The kohl pot that Sithathoriunet used to hold her eye-shadow

== Varia ==
Scarab rings
Material	Gold, carnelian, faïence, lapis lazuli, turquoise, carnelian (the EMC scarab); Gold, carnelian, faïence, lapis lazuli, turquoise, carnelian, feldspar (The Met scarab)
Length	1.6 cm (0.63 in); 1.7 cm (0.67 in)
Width	1.1 cm (0.43 in); 1.0 cm (0.39 in)
Symbols	Scarab
Present location	Egyptian Museum, Cairo; Metropolitan Museum of Art, New York City
Identification	JdE 44921, 16.1.24

There were two similar inlaid scarabs mounted on thin gold wires formed into rings by wrapping the ends about each other that were contained in the jewellery chest. One is held by The Met and the other by the EMC. The scarabs have polished gold bases and cloisonné bodies. The sides are inlaid with carnelian and blue and green – now white – faïence, the stripes of the wings are framed with gold and inlaid with lapis lazuli and turquoise, and the thorax is inlaid with carnelian. The heads differ between the two with The Met's having an elaborated, inlaid feldspar stone and the EMC's a simple one of lapis lazuli. The scarabs represented Ra-khepri.

Motto clasps
Material	Gold, carnelian, faïence
Height	1.2 cm (0.47 in) (šn); 1.7 cm (0.67 in) (šn); 2.0 cm (0.79 in) (ꜣw-t ỉb); 2.3 cm (0.91 in) (sꜣ ꜥnḫ nb); 1.5 cm (0.59 in) (nṯrï ỉb ḥtp)
Width	1.3 cm (0.51 in) (šn); 1.8 cm (0.71 in) (šn); 2.1 cm (0.83 in) (ꜣw-t ỉb); 1.9 cm (0.75 in) (sꜣ ꜥnḫ nb); 1.4 cm (0.55 in) (nṯrï ỉb ḥtp)
Present location	Metropolitan Museum of Art, New York City
Identification	16.1.16, 16.1.17, 16.1.18, 16.1.19, 16.1.20

Five cloisonné motto clasps were recovered from the recess, of which three came from the jewellery chest and two from the crown chest. Each clasp was gold inlaid with carnelian and coloured faïence simulating lapis lazuli and turquoise. The clasps were small with a pair of gold tubes on their reverse through which a thread could be strung, but none of the recovered beads were associated with them, suggesting they were strung on bare thread which had disintegrated. They have been reconstructed to be worn above the elbow. Two were fashioned into šn for 'eternity', and three into one each of ꜣw-t ỉb for 'joy', sꜣ ꜥnḫ nb for 'all life and protection', and nṯrï ỉb ḥtp for 'the two gods's heart is contented'. Such clasps were common to the period and were found in the tombs of Khenmet, Sithathor, and Mereret.

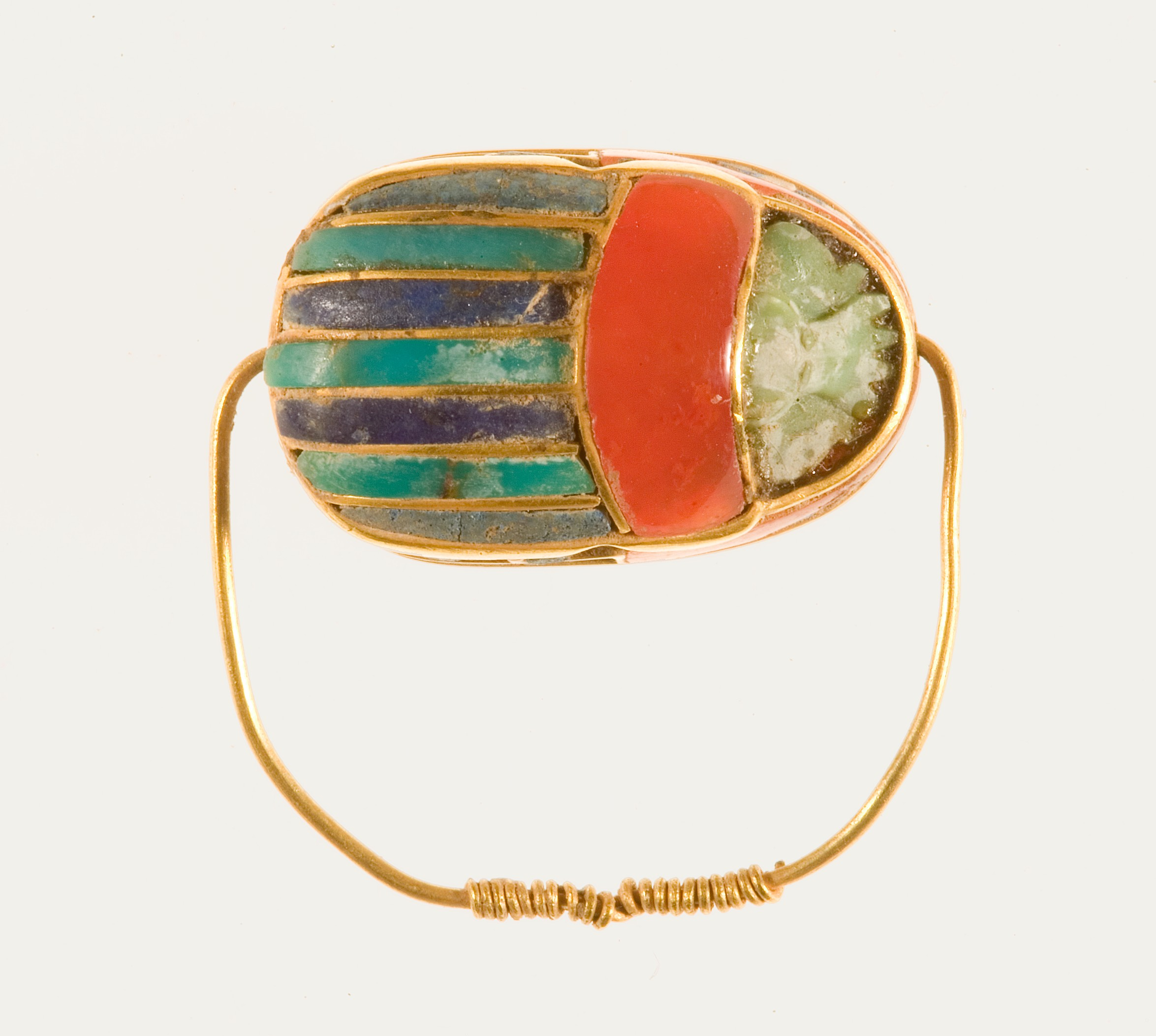
The feldspar headed scarab ring of Sithathoriunet

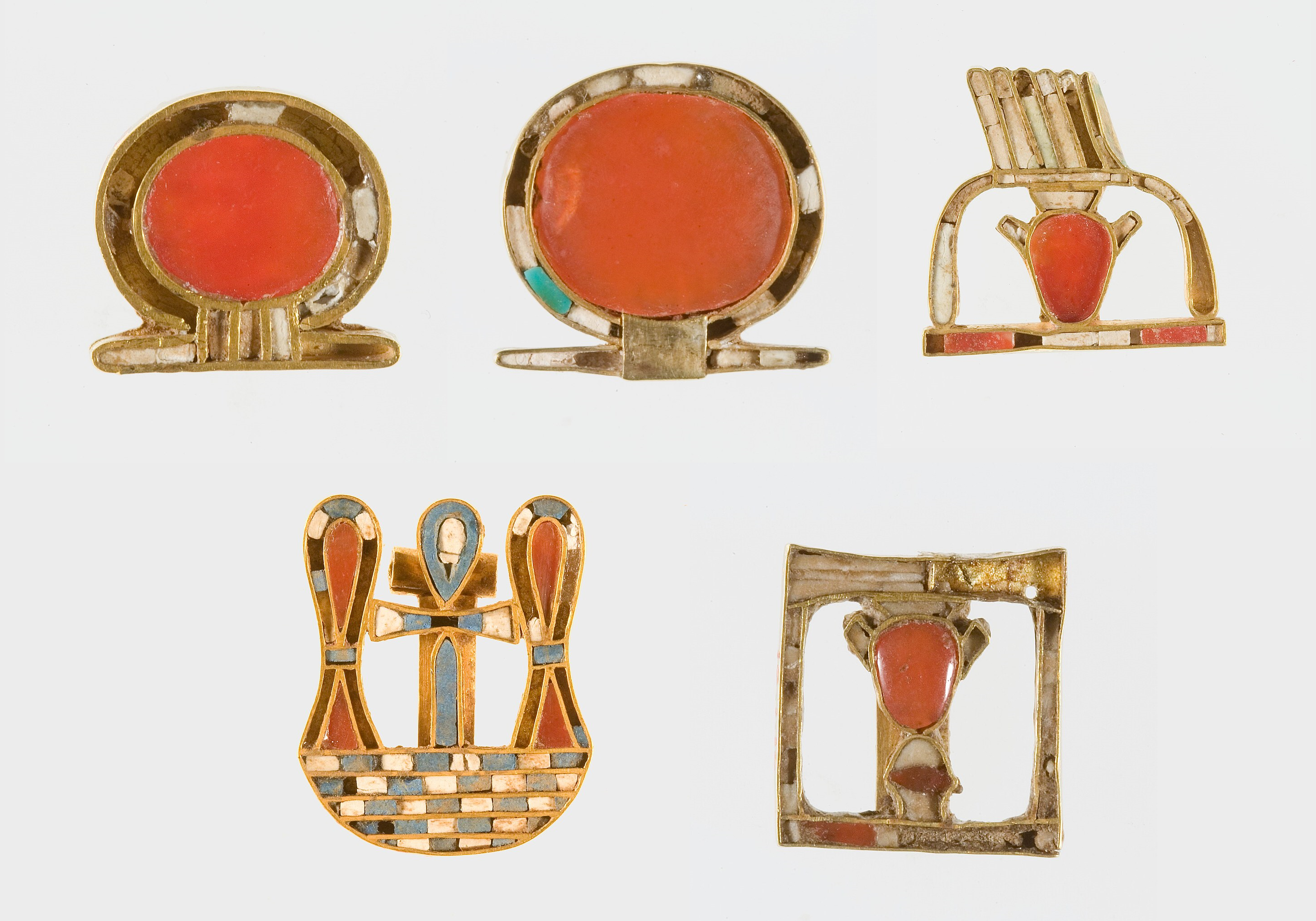
The five motto clasps from the jewellery chest top and crown chest bottom (Note: Top left and middle are šn, top right is ꜣw-t ỉb, bottom left is sꜣ ꜥnḫ nb, bottom right is nṯrï ỉb ḥtp.)

Lapis lazuli scarabs
Material	Lapis lazuli, gold
Length	1.7 cm (0.67 in)
Writing	Egyptian hieroglyphs
Symbols	Scarab
Present location	Metropolitan Museum of Art, New York City
Identification	16.1.22, 16.1.23

Two lapis lazuli scarabs, one plain and one inscribed, were discovered alongside the crown in the fourth chest. They are similar in size and form, but markedly different in workmanship and quality of stone. The simpler plain scarab is made from a fissured stone, while the inscribed scarab was carved from an exceptionally high-quality piece of lapis lazuli free of fissures, high clarity, and consistent colouration. It has a gold tube running through its middle for stringing. The base is inscribed with Nỉ-mꜣꜥt–rꜥ, below which kneels Heh clasping a pair of palm branches for 'years' enclosing Amenemhat III's praenomen, all flanked by a three-fold scroll either side. The inscription thus grants 'millions of years to Ni-maat-re'. Scarabs were also found in Sithathor's and Mereret's collection from Dahshur, five to nine and twenty of them respectively.

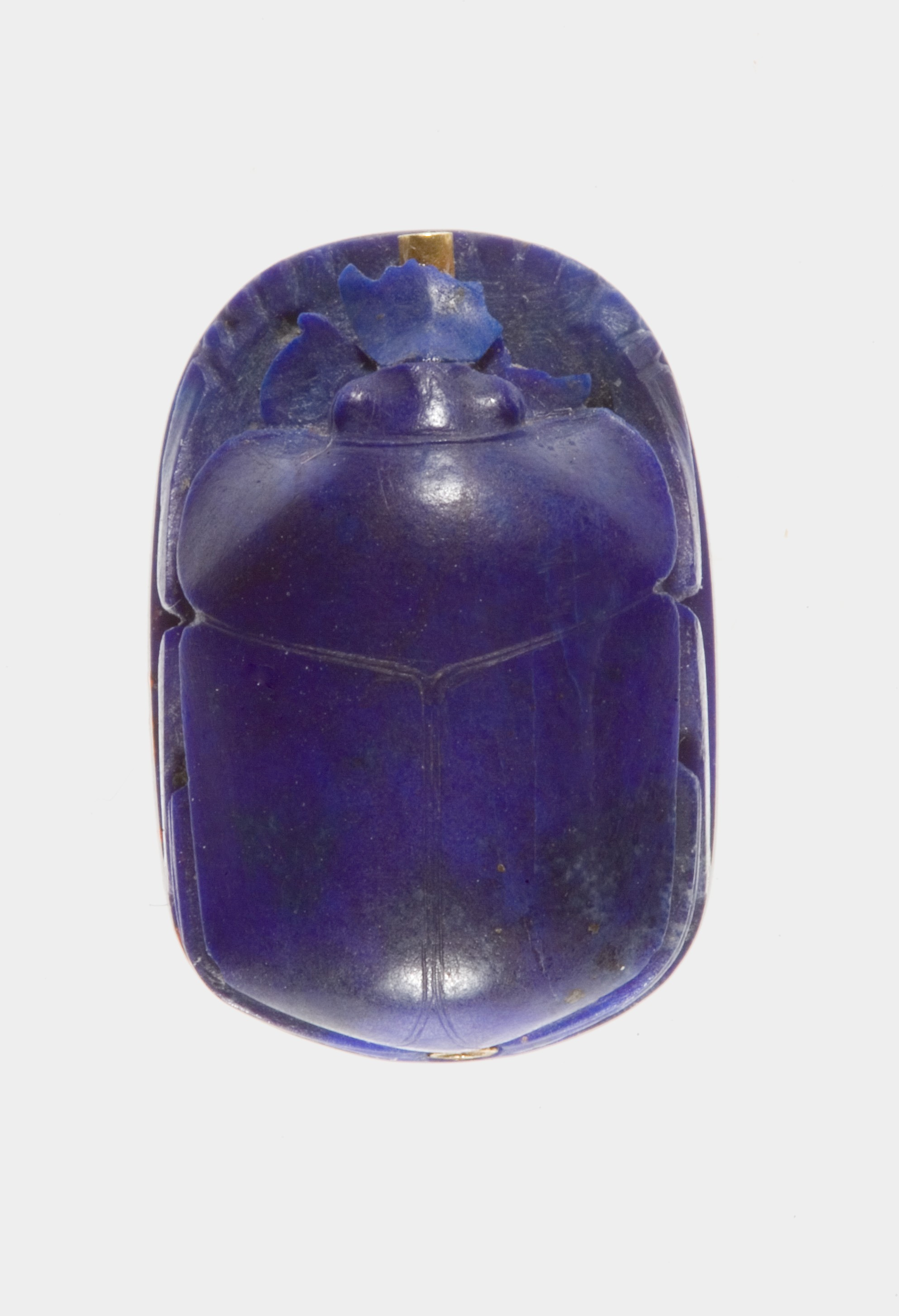
An immaculate lapis lazuli stone was used to fashion this scarab.

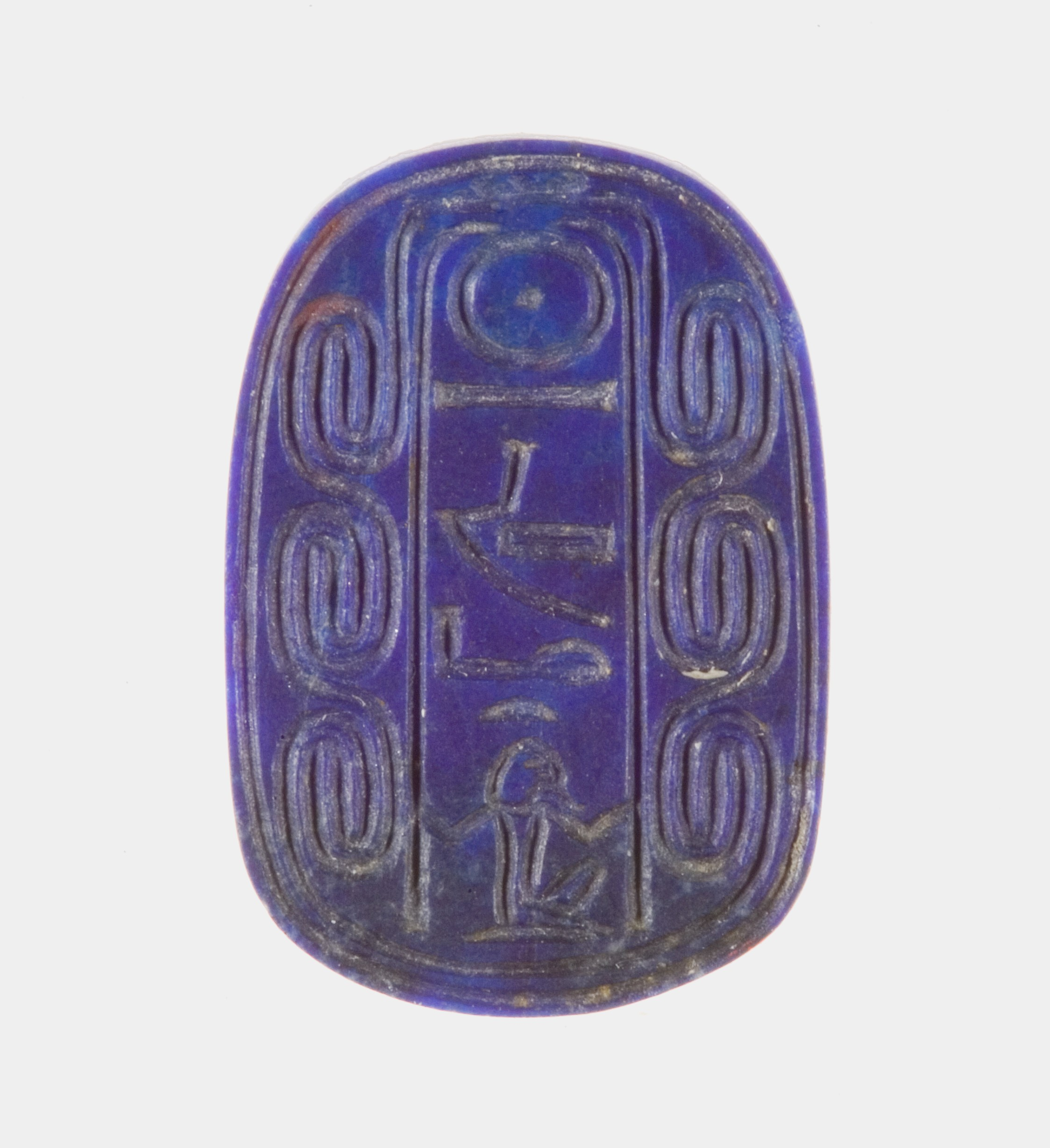
The inscription on its base grants 'millions of years' to Amenemhat III

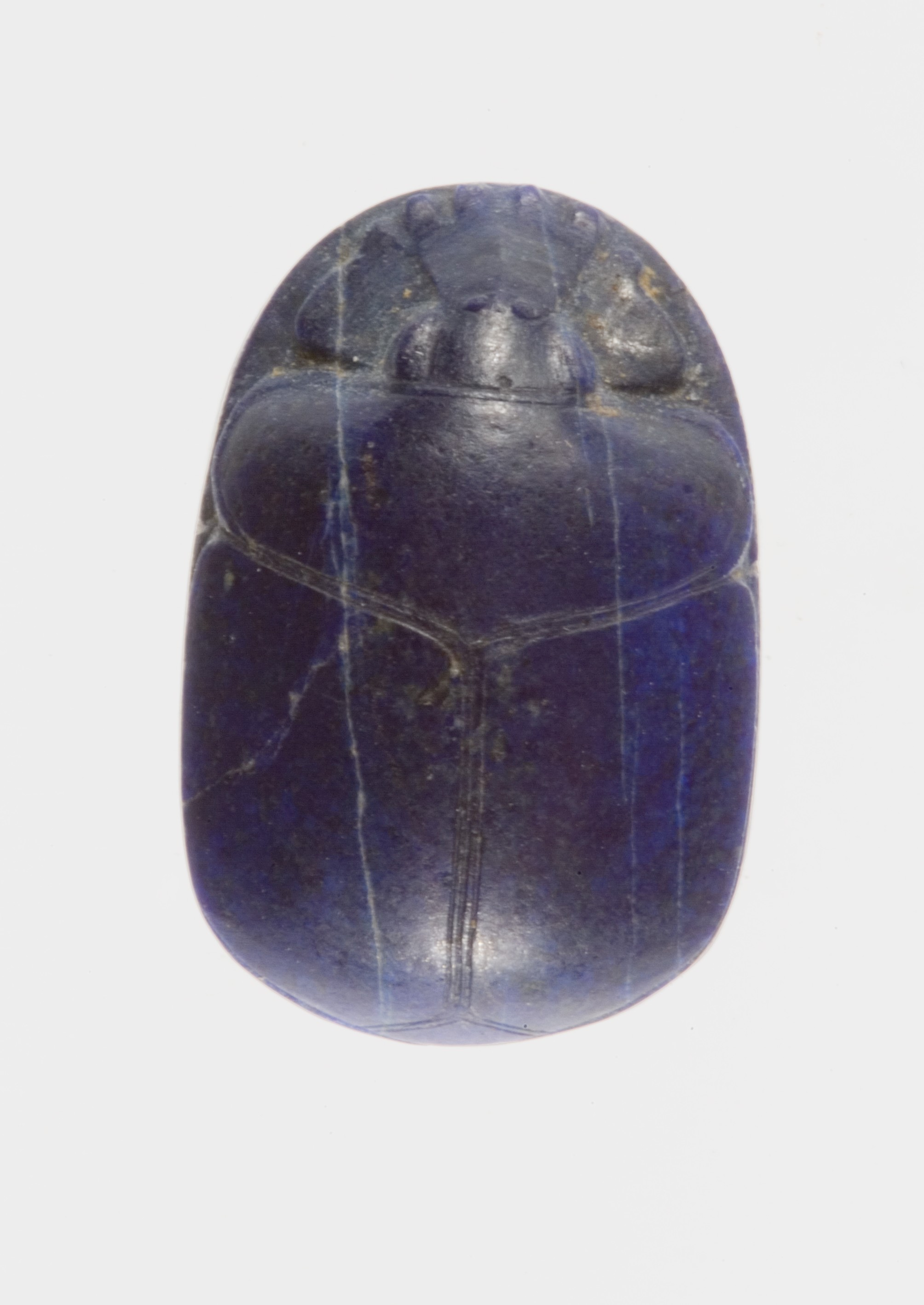
A comparatively inferior stone with fissures and poor colouration forms this scarab

Varia
Present location	Metropolitan Museum of Art, New York City
Identification	MET 16.1.10b, 16.1.11b, 16.1.14b, 16.1.15b, 16.1.49, 16.1.50, 16.1.51 16.1.52, 16.1.53, 16.1.54, 16.1.56, 16.1.57

Finally there was an assortment of items that could not be connected to any of the other discovered objects. This includes a few spare knot clasps and leftover unattached spacers. There are a few knobs from the chests that could not be reconnected. There were additionally a tiny crystal eye, a copper implement that may possibly have been a ring-stand, and piece of gold leaf with a possible waterlily motif.

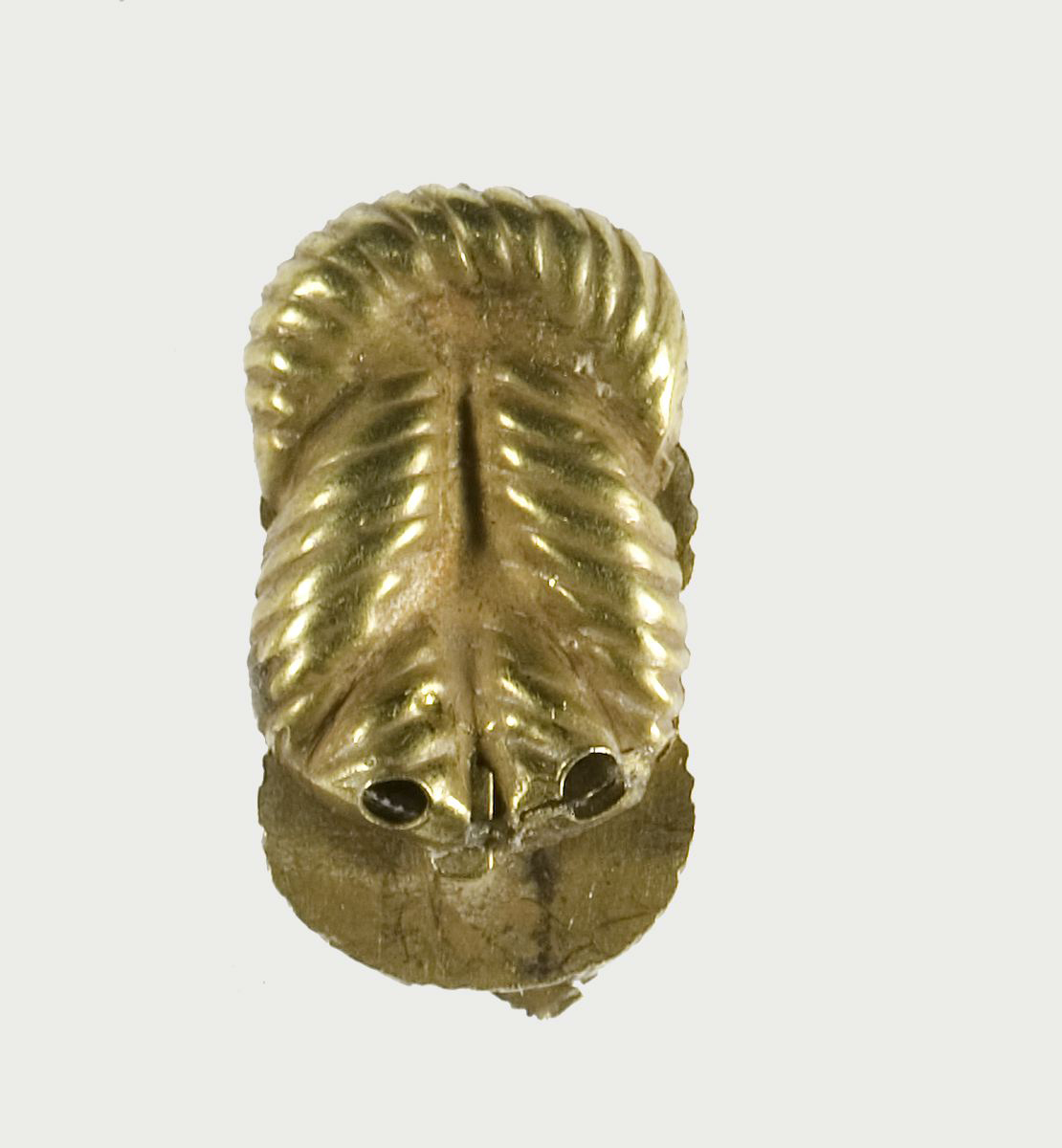
A spare square knot clasp, partially slid open, as on the writslets and claw anklets

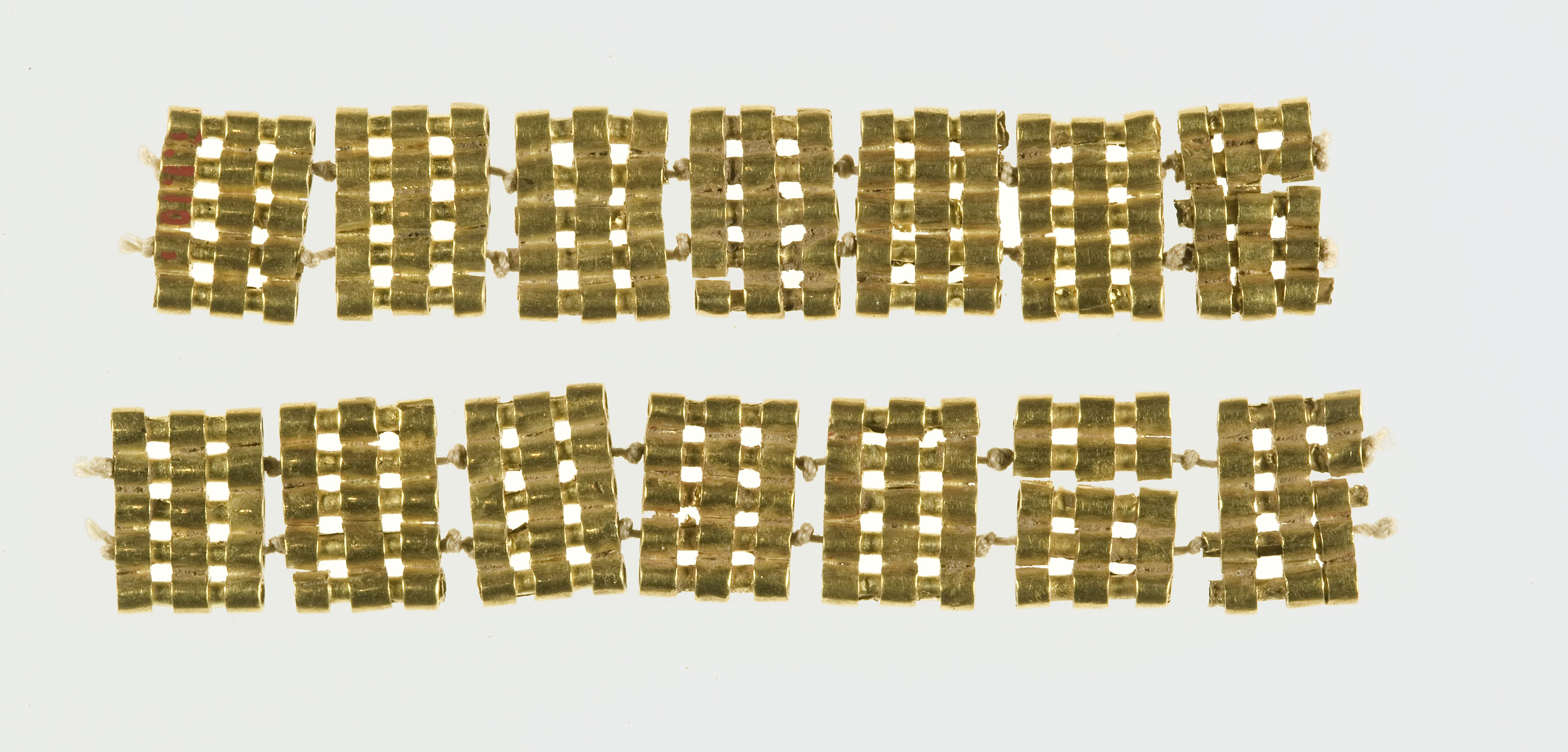
Leftover spacers from the restoration of the broad bracelets and anklets

== Notes ==
Expository notes

Depictory notes

== Bibliography ==
- Aldred, Cyril (1971). Jewels of the Pharaohs: Egyptian Jewelry of the Dynastic Period. New York: Praeger Publishers.
- Andrews, Carol (1997) [1991]. Ancient Egyptian Jewelry. New York: Harry N. Abrams. ISBN 0-8109-2677-6.
- Arnold, Dieter (2002). The Pyramid Complex of Senwosret III at Dahshur: Architectural Studies. Publications of The Metropolitan Museum of Art Egyptian Expedition. Vol. XXVI. New York: The Metropolitan Museum of Art. ISBN 0-87099-956-7.
- Arnold, Dieter (2003). The Encyclopaedia of Ancient Egyptian Architecture. London: I.B. Tauris. ISBN 978-1-86064-465-8.
- Arnold, Dorothea (1995). "An Egyptian Bestiary". The Metropolitan Museum of Art Bulletin. 52 (4). New York: The Metropolitan Museum of Art: 1, 7–64. ISSN 0026-1521.
- Becker, Lawrence; Schorsch, Deborah (2010). "The Practices of Objects Conservation in The Metropolitan Museum of Art". In Centeno, Silvia; Kennedy, Nora; Manuels, Marijn; Schorsch, Deborah; Stone, Richard; Sun, Zhixin Jason; Wypyski, Mark (eds.). Metropolitan Museum of Art Studies in Art, Science, and Technology. Vol. I. New York: The Metropolitan Museum of Art. pp. 11–38. ISBN 978-1-58839-365-4. ISSN 2153-859X.
- Benzel, Kim; Patch, Diana Craig (2018). "The Divine Body". In Holcomb, Melanie (ed.). Jewelry: The Body Transformed. New York: Metropolitan Museum of Art. pp. 65–96. ISBN 978-1-58839-650-1.
- von Bissing, Friedrich Wilhelm (1904). Catalogue Général des Antiquités Égyptiennes du Musée du Caire: No. 18065–18793. Steingefässe (in German). Vol. II. Caire: L'Institut Français d'Archaéologie Orientale.
- Blackman, Aylward M.; Apted, Michael R. (1953). Faulkner, Raymond O. (ed.). The Rock Tombs of Meir: Part VI. Archaeological Survey of Egypt. Vol. XXIX. London: Egypt Exploration Society.
- Borchardt, Ludwig (1911). Catalogue Général des Antiquités Égyptiennes du Musée du Caire: No. 1–380. Statuen und Statuetten: von Königen und Privatleuten (in German). Vol. I. Berlin: Reichsdruckerei.
- Bouillon, Hélène (2014). "A new perspective on so-called Hathoric curls". Ägypten und Levante / Egypt and the Levant. XXIV. Wien: Österreichische Akademie der Wissenschaften: 209–226. eISSN 1813-5145. ISBN 978-3-7001-7745-6. ISSN 1015-5104.
- Brunton, Guy (1920). Lahun I: The Treasure. London: British School of Archaeology in Egypt & Bernard Quaritch.
- Callender, Gae (2003). "The Middle Kingdom Renaissance (c. 2055–1650 BC)". In Shaw, Ian (ed.). The Oxford History of Ancient Egypt. Oxford: Oxford University Press. pp. 137–171. ISBN 978-0-19-815034-3.
- de Morgan, Jacques (1895). Fouilles a Dahchour Mars–Juin 1894 (in French). Vienne: Adolphe Holzhausen.
- de Morgan, Jacques (1903). Fouilles a Dahchour 1894–1895 (in French). Vienne: Adolphe Holzhausen.
- Dodson, Aidan; Hilton, Dyan (2004). The Complete Royal Families of Ancient Egypt. London: Thames & Hudson. ISBN 978-0-500-05128-3.
- Dorman, Peter FitzGerald; Harper, Prudence; Pittman, Holly (1987). The Metropolitan Museum of Art: Egypt and the Ancient Near East. New York: Metropolitan Museum of Art. ISBN 0-87099-413-1.
- Grajetzki, Wolfram (2006). The Middle Kingdom of Ancient Egypt: History, Archaeology and Society. London: Duckworth. ISBN 0-7156-3435-6.
- Grajetzki, Wolfram (2014). Tomb Treasures of the Late Middle Kingdom. Philadelphia: University of Pennsylvania Press. ISBN 978-0-8122-4567-7.
- Grimal, Nicolas (1992). A History of Ancient Egypt. Translated by Ian Shaw. Oxford: Blackwell Publishing. ISBN 978-0-631-19396-8.
- Guerra, Maria F. (2023). "Reflections on gold: colour and workshop practices in Egypt". In Guerra, Maria F; Martinón-Torres, Marcos; Quirke, Stephen (eds.). Ancient Egyptian Gold: Archaeology and science in jewellery (3500-1000 BC). Cambridge, UK: McDonald Institute for Archaeological Research, University of Cambridge. pp. 105–128. ISBN 978-1-913344-13-9.
- Harer, W. Benson (2001). "Lotus". In Redford, Donald B. (ed.). The Oxford Encyclopedia of Ancient Egypt. Vol. 2. Oxford: Oxford University Press. pp. 304–305. ISBN 0-19-510234-7.
- Hayes, William (1978) [1953]. The Scepter of Egypt: A Background for the Study of the Egyptian Antiquities in the Metropolitan Museum of Art, Part 1. From the Earliest Times to the End of the Middle Kingdom. New York: Metropolitan Museum of Art. ISBN 0-87099-190-6.
- Lansing, Ambrose (1940). Egyptian Jewellery: A Picture Book. New York: Metropolitan Museum of Art.
- Lehner, Mark (2008) [1997]. The Complete Pyramids. New York: Thames & Hudson. ISBN 978-0-500-28547-3.
- Lilyquist, Christine; Dorman, Peter; Russman, Edna R. (1983). "Egyptian Art". The Metropolitan Museum of Art Bulletin. 41 (3). New York: Metropolitan Museum of Art. ISSN 0026-1521.
- Lythgoe, Albert M. (1907). "The Egyptian Expedition". The Metropolitan Museum of Art Bulletin. 2 (10). New York: Metropolitan Museum of Art: 163–167. ISSN 0026-1521.
- Lythgoe, Albert M. (1919). "The Treasure of Lahun". The Metropolitan Museum of Art Bulletin. 14 (12, 2). New York: Metropolitan Museum of Art: 1–28. ISSN 0026-1521.
- Mace, Arthur Cruttenden; Winlock, Herbert Eustis (1916). The Tomb of Senebtisi at Lisht. Publications of The Metropolitan Museum of Art Egyptian Expedition. Vol. I. New York: The Metropolitan Museum of Art.
- Mace, Arthur Cruttenden (1920). "The Caskets of Princess Sat-Hathor-Iunut". The Metropolitan Museum of Art Bulletin. 15 (7). New York: Metropolitan Museum of Art: 151–156. ISSN 0026-1521.
- Maspero, Gaston (1930). Art in Egypt. New York: Charles Scribner's Sons.
- Oppenheim, Adela (2000). "The Royal Treasures of the Twelfth Dynasty". In Tiradritti, Francesco (ed.). Egyptian Treasures from the Egyptian Museum in Cairo. Vercelli, Italy: White Star Publishers. pp. 136–153. ISBN 88-8095-515-2.
- Patch, Diana Craig (2015). "Catalogue Entries for '52A, B Two Boxes of Sithathoryunet', '54A, B. Pectoral of Princess Sithathoryunet', 55A–F. Sets of Bracelets and Anklets of Princess Sithathoryunet', '56. Cowrie Shell Girdle of Princess Sithathoryunet', and '57A–E. Feline-Headed Girdle, Anklets, and Bracelets of Princess Sithathoryunet'". In Oppenheim, Adela; Arnold, Dorothea; Arnold, Dieter; Yamamoto, Kei (eds.). Ancient Egypt Transformed: The Middle Kingdom. New York: The Metropolitan Museum of Art. pp. 110–111 [CAT. 52], 114–115 [CAT. 54], 116–117 [CAT. 55], 117–118 [CAT. 56], 119 [CAT. 57]. ISBN 978-1-58839-564-1.
- Petrie, William Matthew Flinders (1914-05-20). "The Treasure of Lahun". The Times. No. 40528. London: The Times Digital Archive.
- Petrie, William Matthew Flinders; Brunton, Guy; Murray, Margaret Alice (1923). Lahun II. London: British School of Archaeology in Egypt & Bernard Quaritch.
- Roehrig, Catherine H. (2015). "Catalogue Entries for '53A, B. Cosmetic Vessels of Princess Sithathoryunet'". In Oppenheim, Adela; Arnold, Dorothea; Arnold, Dieter; Yamamoto, Kei (eds.). Ancient Egypt Transformed: The Middle Kingdom. New York: The Metropolitan Museum of Art. pp. 112 [CAT. 53]. ISBN 978-1-58839-564-1.
- Saleh, Mohammed; Sourouzian, Hourig (1987). Official Catalogue: The Egyptian Museum Cairo. Mainz am Rhein: Organization of Egyptian Antiquities. ISBN 3-8053-0942-2.
- Schorsch, Deborah (2015). "Supplement: Technical Study of the Sithathoryunet Pectoral". In Oppenheim, Adela; Arnold, Dorothea; Arnold, Dieter; Yamamoto, Kei (eds.). Ancient Egypt Transformed: The Middle Kingdom. New York: The Metropolitan Museum of Art. pp. 115–116. ISBN 978-1-58839-564-1.
- "The Collection". Met Museum. Metropolitan Museum of Art.
- Verner, Miroslav (2001) [1999]. The Pyramids: The Mystery, Culture and Science of Egypt's Great Monuments. New York: Grove Press. ISBN 978-0-8021-1703-8.
- Vernier, Émile (1925). Catalogue Général des Antiquités Égyptiennes du Musée du Caire: No. 52640–53171. Bijoux et Orfèvreries (in French). Vol. 3. Caire: L'Institut Français d'Archaéologie Orientale.
- Wilkinson, Alix (1971). Ancient Egyptian Jewellery. London: Metheun & Co. Ltd.
- Winlock, Herbert Eustis (1934). The Treasure of El Lāhūn. New York: Metropolitan Museum of Art.
