= Pyramid of Senusret II =

Ancient Egyptian pyramid

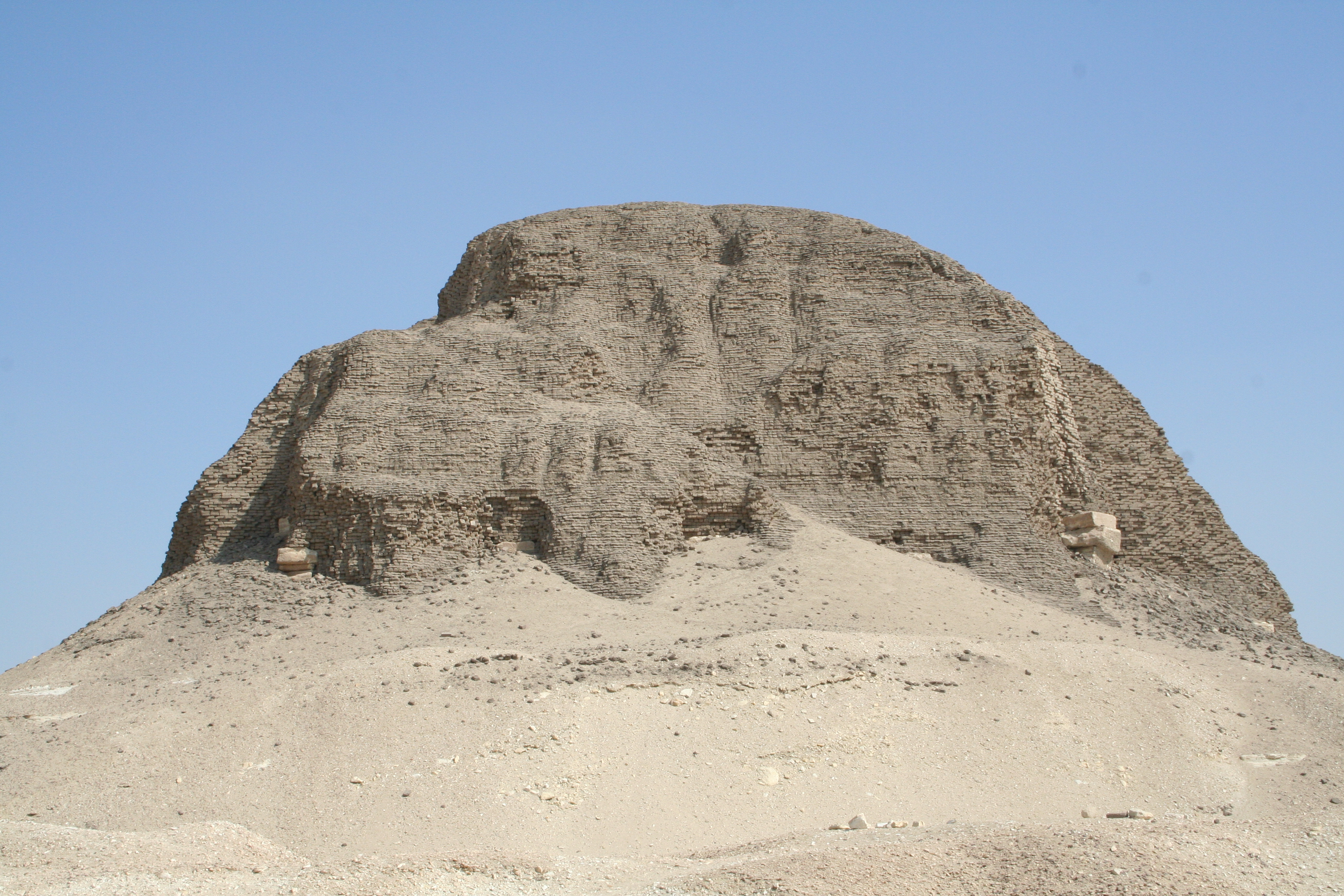

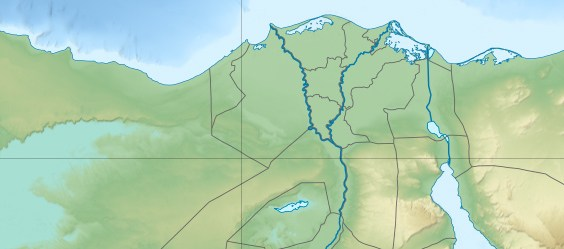
- Location within Lower Egypt
- 29°14′N 30°58′E
- Owner: Senusret II
Ancient name
- < F12 S29 D21 X1 O34 N35 > N28 O24
- Ḫꜥỉ Sn-wsr-t
- Khai Sen-user-et
- "Senusret shines"
- Constructed: Twelfth Dynasty
- Material: Mudbrick
- Height: 48.65 m (159 ft 7 in; 92.84 cu)
- Base: 107 m (351 ft; 204 cu) (socket level) or 106 m (348 ft; 202 cu) (ground level)
- Slope: 42°35'

The pyramid of Senusret II (Egyptian: Ḫꜥỉ Sn-wsr-t, lit. 'Senusret shines') is the funerary monument at El Lahun built for the Egyptian pharaoh Senusret II of the Twelfth Dynasty in the early 19th century BC. (Note: Proposed dates for Senusret II's reign: c. 1900–1880 BC, c. 1897–1878 BC, c. 1897–1877 BC, c. 1895–1878 BC, c. 1877–1870 BC.) The complex centers on a mudbrick pyramid, built atop a yellow limestone outcrop found at the site, that has a ground level base of 106 m (348 ft) with sides converging at 42°35′ ± 3′ to the apex 48.65 m (159.6 ft) high. It was once encased in fine white Tura limestone – which was plundered by Ramesses II in the Nineteenth Dynasty for use in his projects – and capped with a black granite pyramidion. Beneath the pyramid lay pharaoh's funerary chamber. The passages to this substructure had been placed beneath the north chapel adjacent to the pyramid's north face since Djoser built his Step Pyramid in the Third Dynasty, but Senusret II chose to hide it away beneath a princess's tomb, designated 'tomb 10', southeast of the main pyramid to protect his tomb from future grave-robbers. The complex had a small mortuary temple built adjacent the pyramid's east face which was destroyed during Ramesses II's reign, an open causeway which remains unexplored, and a valley temple seemingly disconnected from the rest of the complex owing to its distance from it. The complex was served from a pyramid town called Ḥtp Sn-wsr-t, meaning 'May Senusret be at peace' or 'Senusret is contented', by ancient Egyptians, but is now known as Kahun.

== Location and excavation ==
Karl Richard Lepsius visited the pyramid in the 1840s and conducted a brief archaeological survey of the site. Fifty years later, Flinders Petrie conducted the first comprehensive excavations there. A small team led by N. B. Millet of the Royal Ontario Museum and the architect J. E. Knudstad has been working at the site of the pyramid town and pyramid since 1989. They aim to expand upon Petrie's work by re-gathering architectural details of the monuments there, which Petrie had neglected to record in his reports. On 28 June 2019, the pyramid was opened to visitors for the first time since its discovery.

== Mortuary complex ==
=== Main pyramid ===
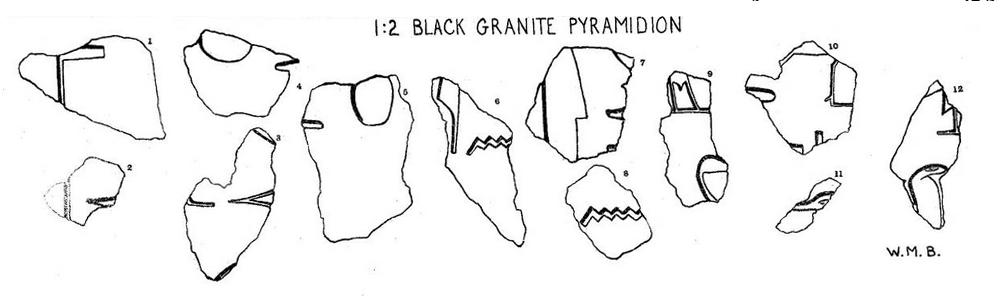
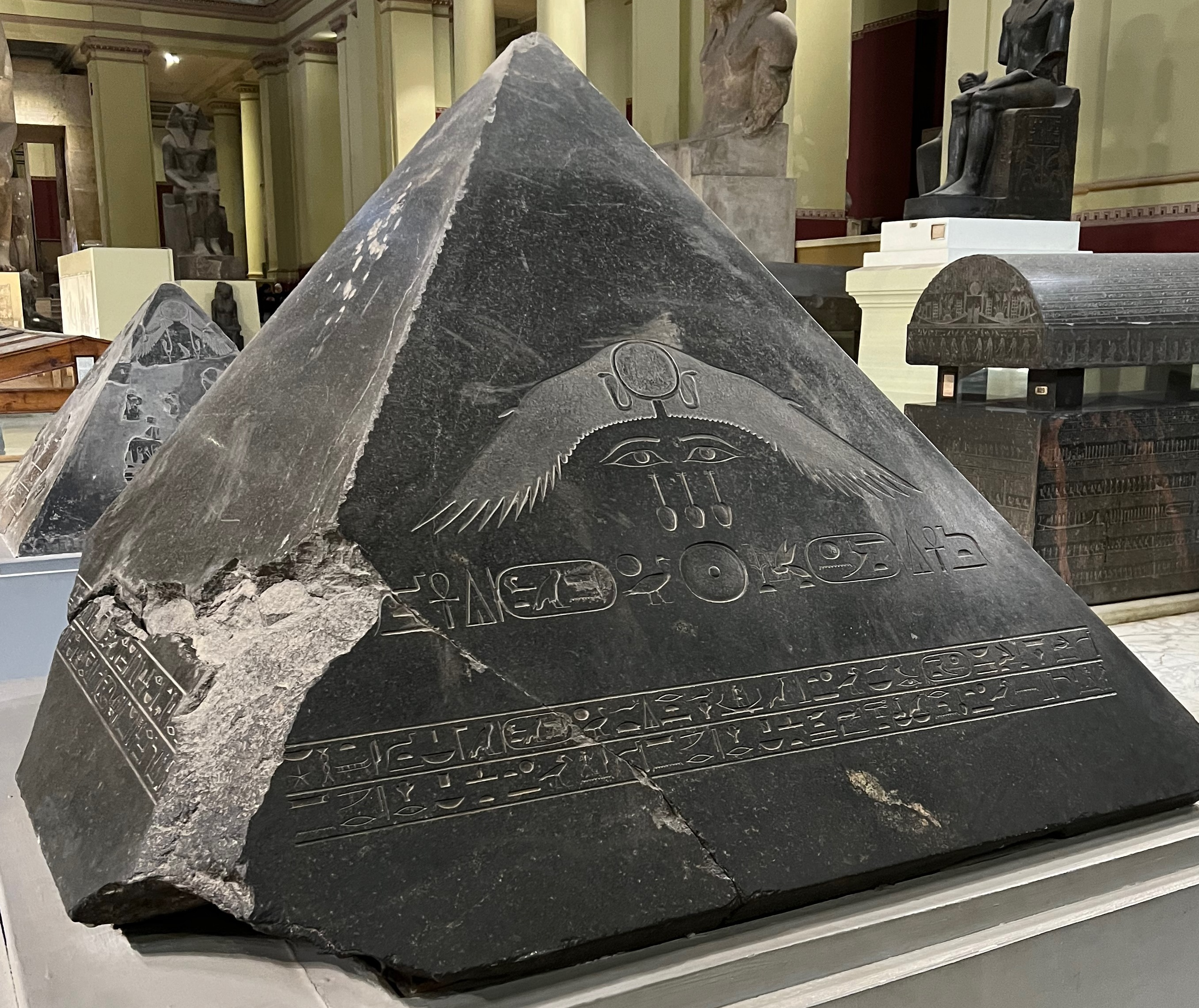
Senusret II's pyramid was built around and atop a yellow limestone outcrop, approximately 12.2 m (40 ft) high, that the builders used to anchor the core and with the added benefit of reducing construction time and cost. On top of the outcrop, retaining walls were built extending radially outward to the pyramid corners with additional parallel walls spaced between which were then packed with mudbrick. The completed pyramid was encased in fine Tura limestone, which was set into a trench cut into the bedrock intended to prevent a collapse during rainfall, that was plundered in the Nineteenth Dynasty by Ramesses II for his own projects as Petrie discovered from an inscription. It was crowned with a pyramidion of black granite, of which only traces remain. (Note: Drawings of the fragments of the black granite pyramidion of Senusret II's pyramid at El-Lahun Exemplar pyramidion from the Black Pyramid of Amenemhat III also from the Twelfth Dynasty)

The pyramid had a base length of approximately 106 m (348 ft; 202 cu) at ground level and 107 m (351 ft; 204 cu) at the base of the casing trench about 0.66 m (2 ft 2 in) below ground level. It converged at an average of 42°35′ ± 3′ towards the apex approximately 48.65 m (159 ft 7 in; 92.84 cu) high. The superstructure was surrounded by a sloped sand-filled trench built to absorb rainwater and protect the substructure from flooding. This trench had a short limestone perimeter wall decorated with deep niches, a reference to the enclosure wall of Djoser's step pyramid.

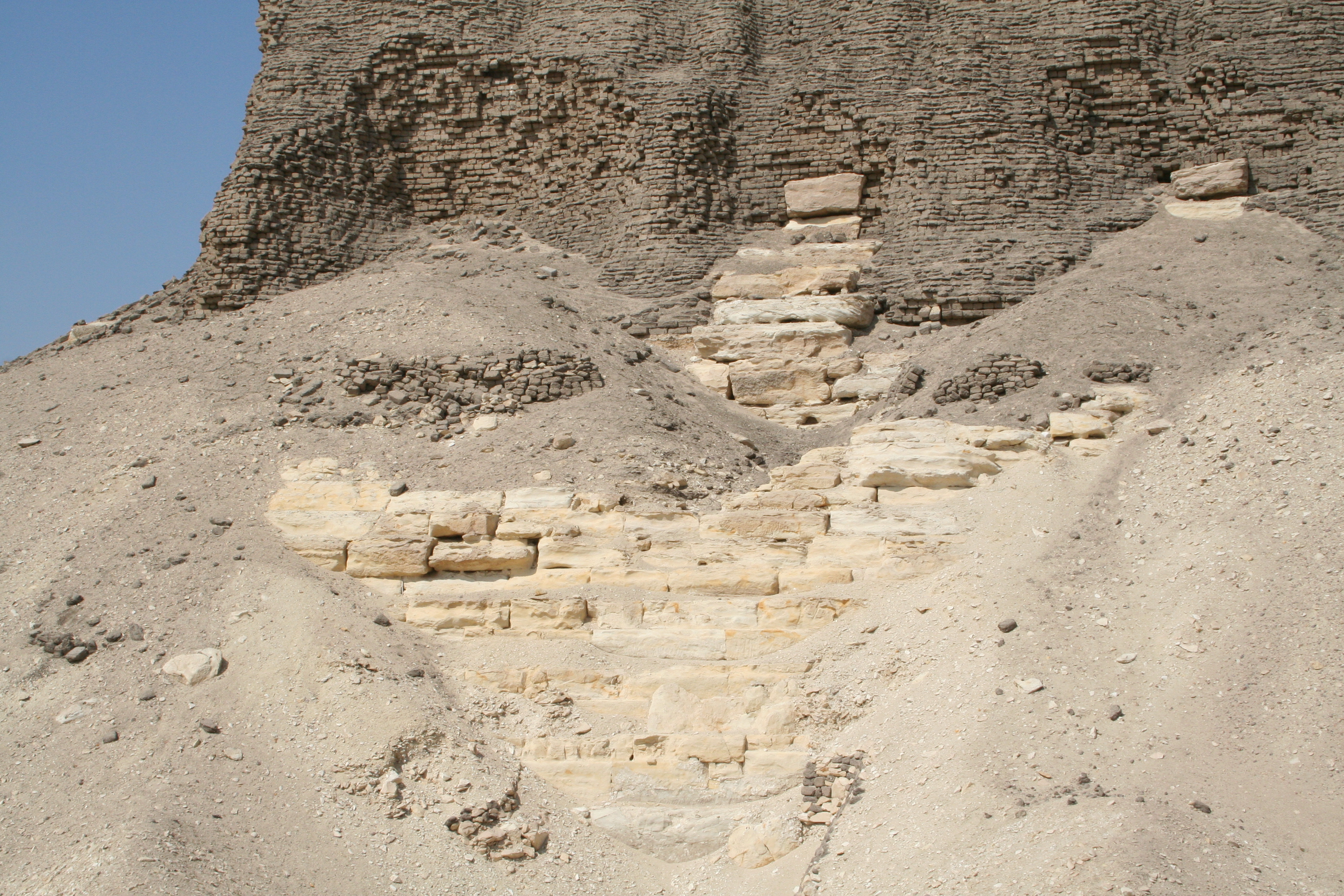
East face with extensive remains of the limestone cladding buried in the sand beneath the pyramid core

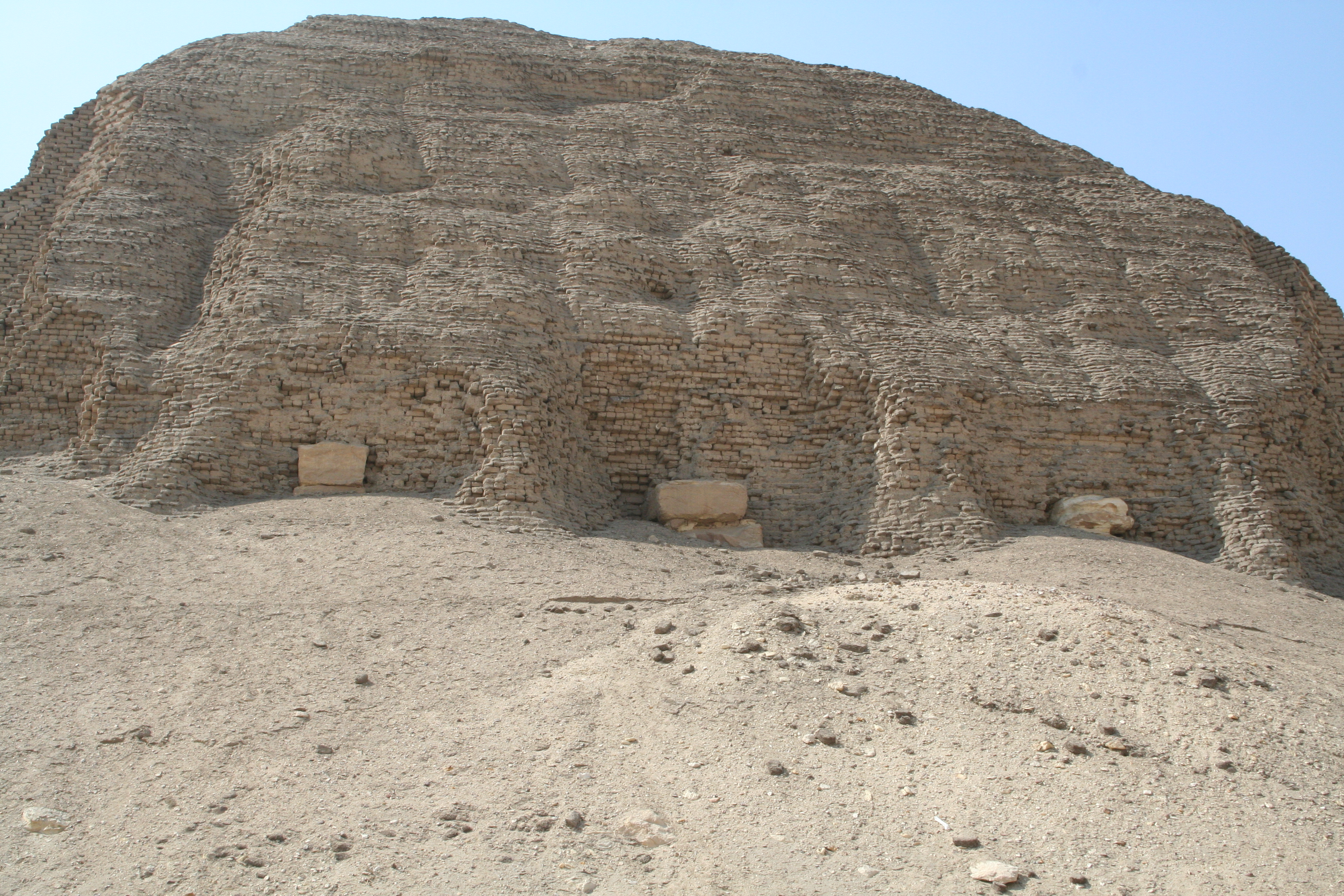
North face with the limestone blocks of three parallel retaining walls jutting beyond the mudbrick

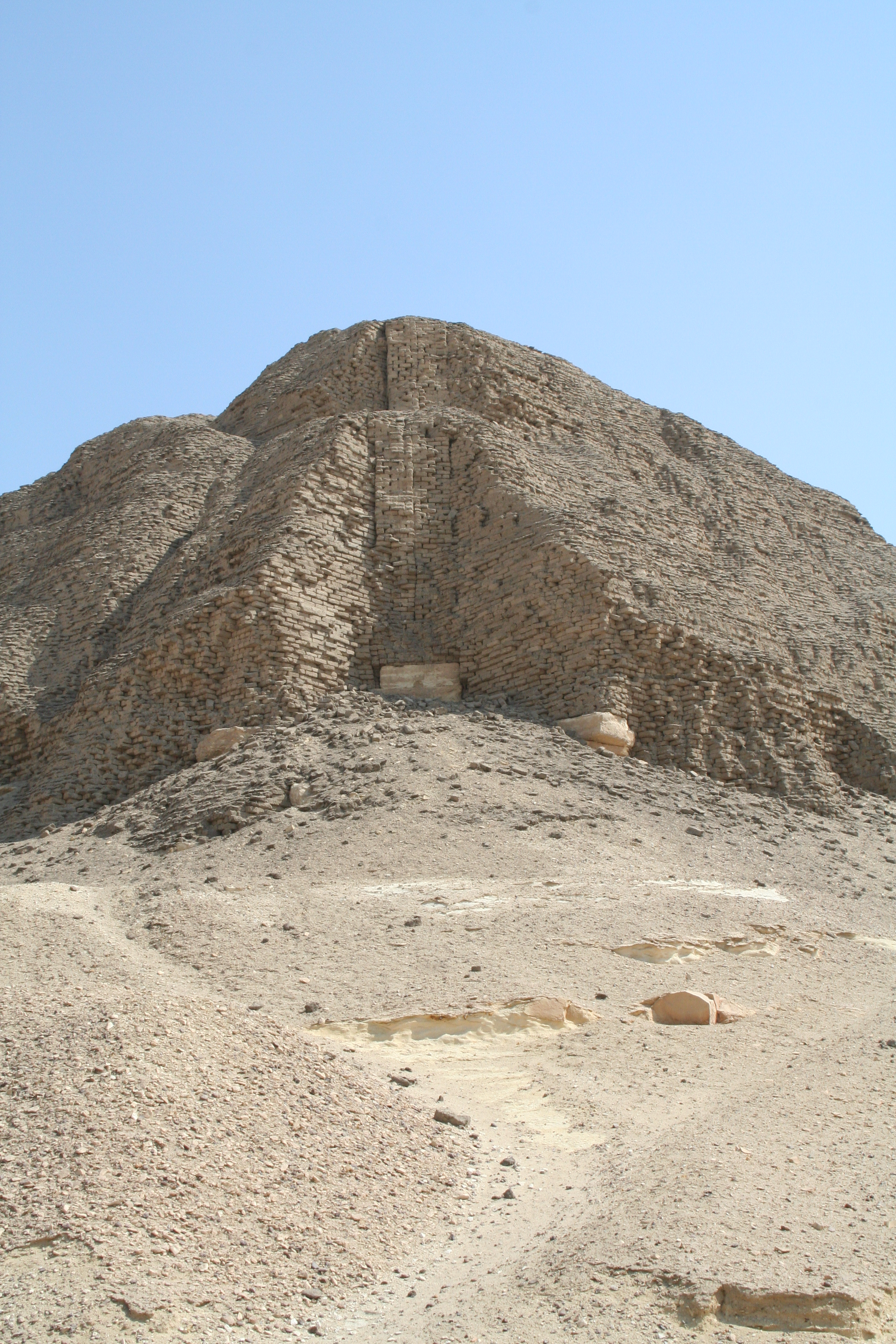
Southwest corner with the limestone blocks of a radial retaining wall and a parallel retaining wall either side

=== Substructure ===
==== Tomb 10 ====
The entry point into an Egyptian pyramid's substructure was always placed on the north side, and had been since Djoser built his step pyramid in the Third Dynasty. This served a religious function by pointing the exit passage towards the circumpolar stars, which the pharaoh joined in the afterlife. Though Sensuret II had a north chapel built, he had the substructure's true entrance hidden-away on the southeast side of the pyramid. This was intended to protect the tomb from thieves, and while Petrie was delayed by months in discovering a passage to the substructure, he found that it had nevertheless been robbed millennia prior. Petrie had Fraser investigate a wide pit that was discovered south of the pyramid's southeast side. This first shaft was used for the burial rites of the king, but was too narrow for use in construction. Instead, a second, larger shaft found further south beneath the floor of a princess's tomb (Note: Designated as 'tomb 10' by Petrie and Brunton.) was used for transporting the sarcophagus and building materials into the substructure.

The princess's tomb was accessed from a wide shaft 8.64 m (28 ft 4 in) deep. The shaft had a small pit containing an immaculately thrown red pottery bowl and probably also the bones of a calf that were found scattered around the floor. Beyond it lay the tomb's antechamber that was hidden behind a set of fine limestone blocks. It had walls partially of fine white limestone and partially of bare rock with a statue niche carved into the west wall and a pavement that sloped down towards the burial chamber. The burial chamber had walls faced with fine white limestone alongside two adjoining rooms comprising a canopic recess in the east and an offering hall in the northeast. The remains found in the burial chamber included a fragment of a wooden coffin and a green feldspar scarab.

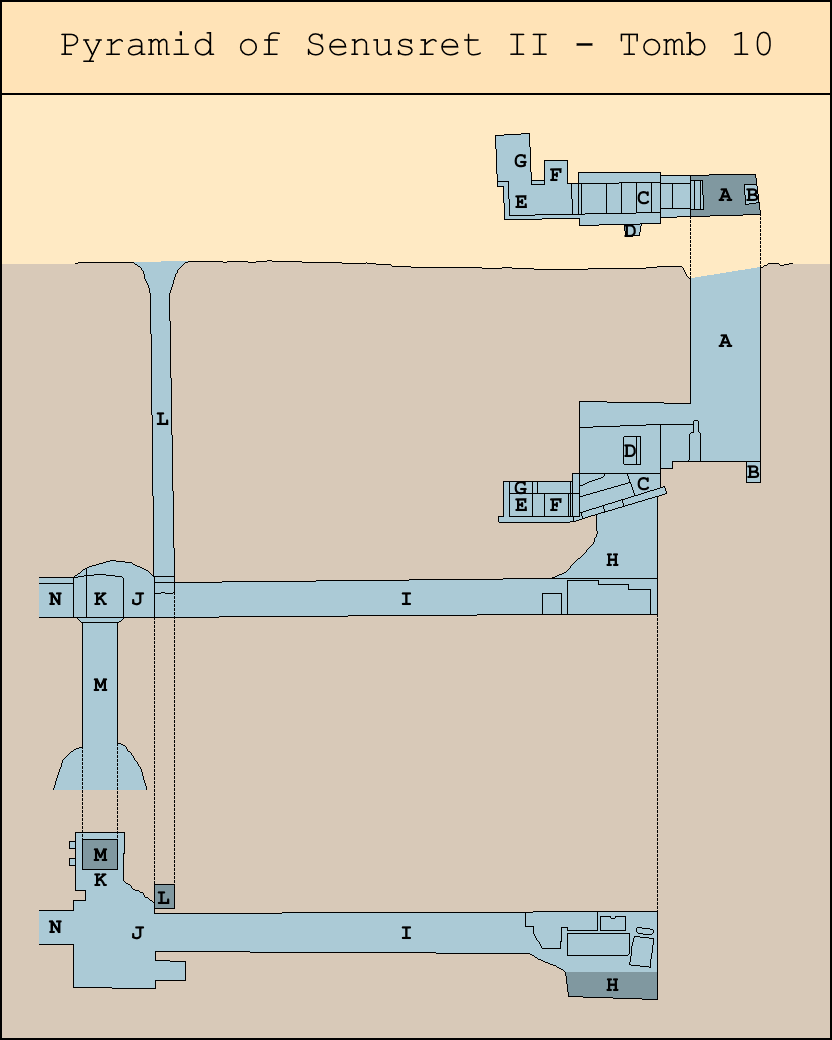
Plan of 'tomb 10' according to Hilda Petrie in Lahun I in 1920 (Note: Tomb plan: A) shaft of 'upper tomb'; B) small pit; C) antechamber; D) statue niche; E) burial chamber; F) canopic recess; G) offering hall; H) antechamber shaft; I) corridor; J) entrance chamber; K) well room; L) shaft of 'lower tomb'; M) well; and N) passage to the pyramid.)

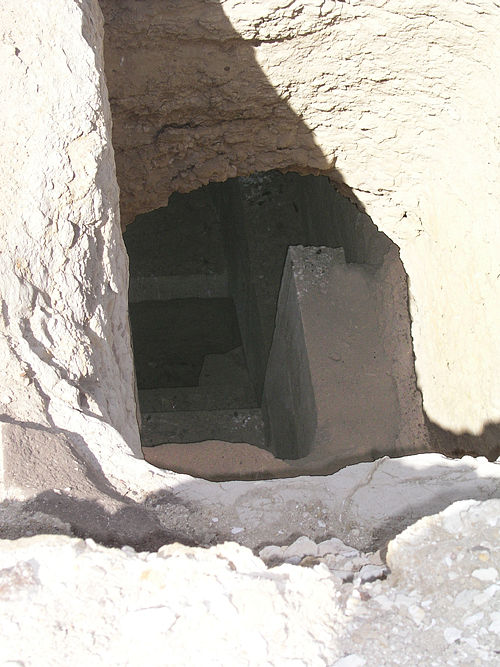
Entrance into 'tomb 10' and the pyramid of Senusret II

==== Subterranean passages ====
In the antechamber of 'tomb 10', a collapse in the pavement revealed a secondary shaft that connected on its east to a long north–south oriented corridor which was originally closed off by limestone blocks, but that defence had been circumvented by robbers cutting away the corner wall between the two rooms. The corridor had substantial debris deposits forcing excavators to crawl whilst working in it. It was measured to be 18.6 m (61 ft) long, 2.13 m (7.0 ft) wide, and 1.22 m (4.0 ft) high with a vaulted ceiling. It led into a 'lower tomb' or 'entrance chamber', where the entry to the pyramid substructure was originally discovered by way of the narrow shaft. This second shaft connects to the entrance chamber through a small hole raised above the floor of the chamber.

The entrance chamber sits about 16 m (52 ft 6 in) below ground level, and measured 3.35 m (11.0 ft) north–south by 5.28 m (17 ft 4 in) east–west up to a recessed room containing a deep well. Its walls and ceiling remained bare rock. The well room measured 2.08 m (6 ft 10 in) north–south by 2.59 m (8 ft 6 in) east–west, while the well itself measured 1.22 m (4.0 ft) by 1.52 m (5.0 ft). The function of the well remains unclear. Petrie made efforts to explore it for further passages, but desisted after draining to a depth of 6.71 m (22 ft 0 in) where the determination was made that its base had been reached and that no new chambers existed to be discovered. Thus it may have served simply to monitor the level of groundwater. The well room also contained two recesses carved into its northern wall whose purpose is unknown. These chambers were also a strong source of pottery finds, mainly of Middle Kingdom types though a couple were ascribed to the New Kingdom.

The vaulted corridor then resumes its northward path from the entrance chamber in two sections separated by the 'passage chamber' and terminates at a tall doorway (Note: Measuring 1.37 m (4 ft 6 in) wide and 1.78 m (5 ft 10 in) tall.) into Senusret II's antechamber. It is inclined at an average of 6°46′ that is shallower in the lower section (Note: Leading to the passage chamber and is 16.46 m (54 ft 0 in) long, 1.63 m (5 ft 4 in) wide, with walls 1.88 m (6 ft 2 in) tall, and a vaulted ceiling reaching 2.03 m (6 ft 8 in) high along its centre.) and steeper in the upper section. (Note: Leading to the antechamber and is 22.71 m (74 ft 6 in) long, 1.93 m (6 ft 4 in) wide, with walls 1.75 m (5 ft 9 in) tall, and a vaulted ceiling reaching 2.00 m (6 ft 7 in) high along its centre.) The 'passage chamber' is uneven with an average length of 3.19 m (10 ft 6 in) north–south and 6.90 m (22 ft 8 in) east–west, and was found filled with debris rock from an unknown source. From the chamber, Brunton recovered pottery from various periods including from the Middle Kingdom, Eighteenth and Nineteenth (or later) Dynasties, and the Roman period.

==== Funerary chambers ====
The antechamber was cut into the rock of the outcrop and faced with fine white limestone blocks. It measures an average of 3.13 m (10 ft 3 in) north–south by 4.98 m (16 ft 4 in) east–west, with walls 3.46 m (11 ft 4 in) tall, and a gabled-roof reaching 4.41 m (14 ft 6 in) high. In clearing the chamber, a few fragments of broken pottery and one fragment of an alabaster vessel, all apparently of Twelfth Dynasty worksmanship, were recovered. In the west end is a passage (Note: Opening at 2.06 m (6 ft 9 in) wide, but contracts to 1.77 m (5 ft 10 in) after 1.06 m (3 ft 6 in) before continuing on for a further 4.54 m (14 ft 11 in).) to the burial chamber, the final 0.48 m (1 ft 7 in) of which is lined with red granite, rather than limestone. About a fifth of the way through the passage is a second doorway (Note: Measuring 1.05 m (3 ft 5 in) wide and 0.41 m (1 ft 4 in) deep.) on the south wall with an alternate passage (Note: Travelling south for 10.50 m (34 ft 5 in), then west for 17.74 m (58 ft 2 in), north for 19.89 m (65 ft 3 in), east for 8.41 m (27 ft 7 in), and finally once again south for 7.44 m (24 ft 5 in). It is 1.32 m (4 ft 4 in) wide throughout, but its walls and vaulted ceiling vary in height from 1.78 m (5 ft 10 in) and 2.01 m (6 ft 7 in) respectively in the opening south passage to 1.57 m (5 ft 2 in) and 1.83 m (6 ft 0 in) thereafter.) that winds around the burial chamber before entering it at its northeast corner immediately before the sarcophagus. The winding passage may have served a symbolic purpose in allowing the king's spirit to leave his tomb on the north to join the circumpolar stars; but it also isolated the burial chamber like an island, possibly an allusion to Osiris's tomb.

The whole burial chamber with its vaulted ceiling was clad and paved with blocks of red granite and included a red granite sarcophagus near its west wall before which lay an alabaster offering table bearing Senusret II's name. The chamber was oriented east–west measuring 5.25 m (17 ft 3 in) along that axis and 3.13 m (10 ft 3 in) on the north–south axis. It had walls of variable height about 1.83 m (6 ft 0 in) tall and a vaulted ceiling reaching 2.84 m (9 ft 4 in) high. It also had two entrances from the east and north. (Note: Measuring 1.55 m (5 ft 1 in) wide, 2.08 m (6 ft 10 in) tall; and 1.06 m (3 ft 6 in) wide, 1.32–1.51 m (4 ft 4 in – 4 ft 11 in) tall respectively.) The sarcophagus was exceptionally well made with remarkably minute deviations, but had a pronounced slant towards the south along its length. Petrie remarked that '[t]he sarcophagus is perhaps the finest piece of mechanical work ever executed in such a hard and difficult material'.

The burial chamber has a red granite faced doorway (Note: Measuring 1.04 m (3 ft 5 in) wide, 1.30 m (4 ft 3 in) tall, and 0.52 m (1 ft 8 in) deep.) in its south wall that leads via an unclad passage (Note: Measuring 1.15 m (3 ft 9 in) wide by 2.26 m (7 ft 5 in) long, with walls 1.60 m (5 ft 3 in) tall, and a vaulted ceiling 1.85 m (6 ft 1 in) high.) to the offering chamber. The offering chamber measures 3.25 m (10 ft 8 in) north–south by 2.66 m (8 ft 9 in) east–west, with 1.78 m (5 ft 10 in) tall walls, and a vaulted ceiling reaching 2.78 m (9 ft 1 in) high. It contains a small niche in its west wall that was apparently cut in the Ramesside period. Despite the precautions taken, the funerary apartments were found looted of most of their contents by Petrie. He found a gold uraeus, probably coming from a statue, which convinced him that the pyramid was the sight of Senusret II's burial. The bones of a human leg, ascribed to Senusret II, were also discovered. One further deviation from standard practice was the displacing of the complex of funerary apartments, particularly the burial chamber, and labyrinth of passages southeast of the pyramid's vertical axis.

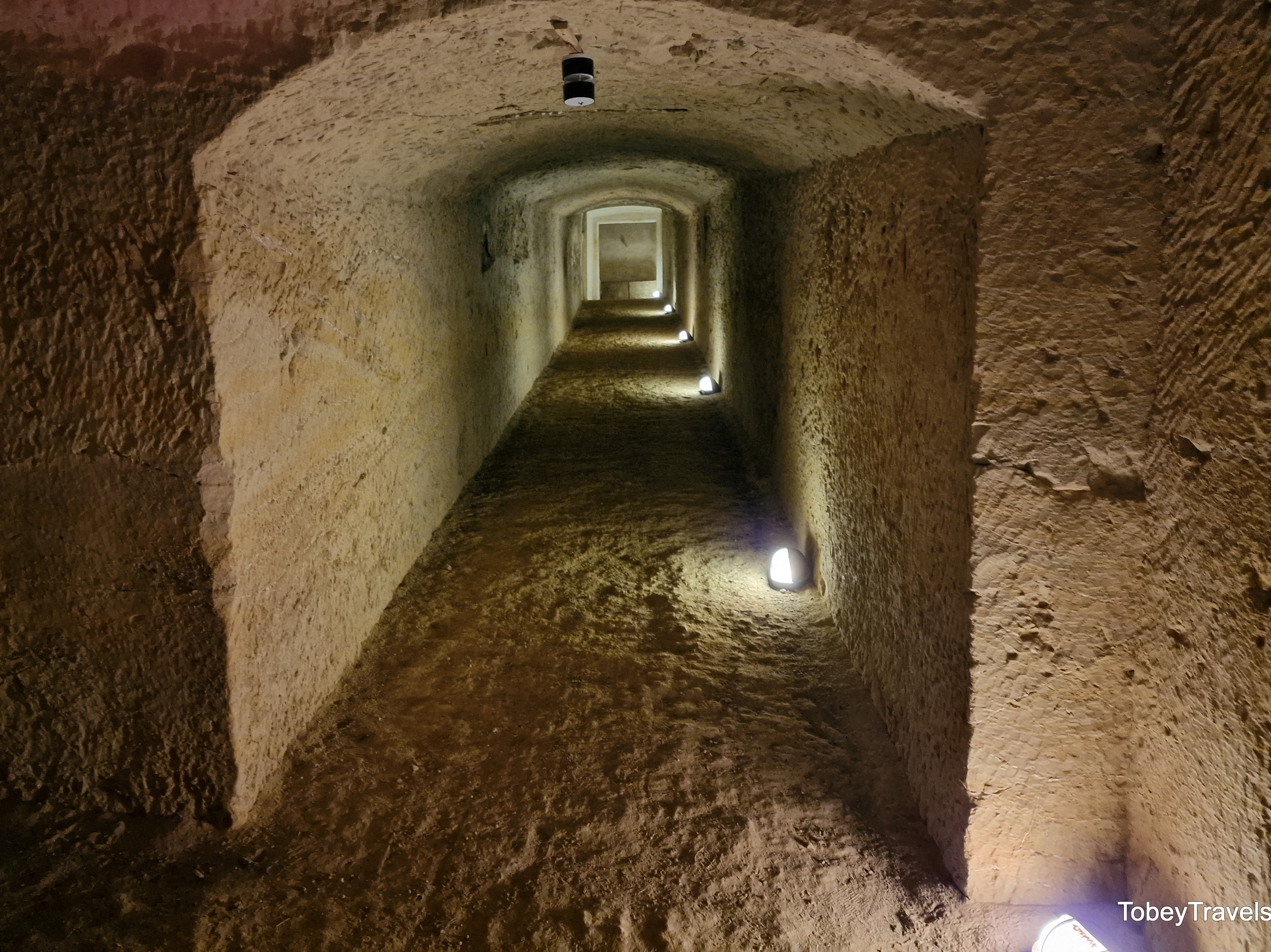
Side passage to Senusret II's burial chamber in the substructure

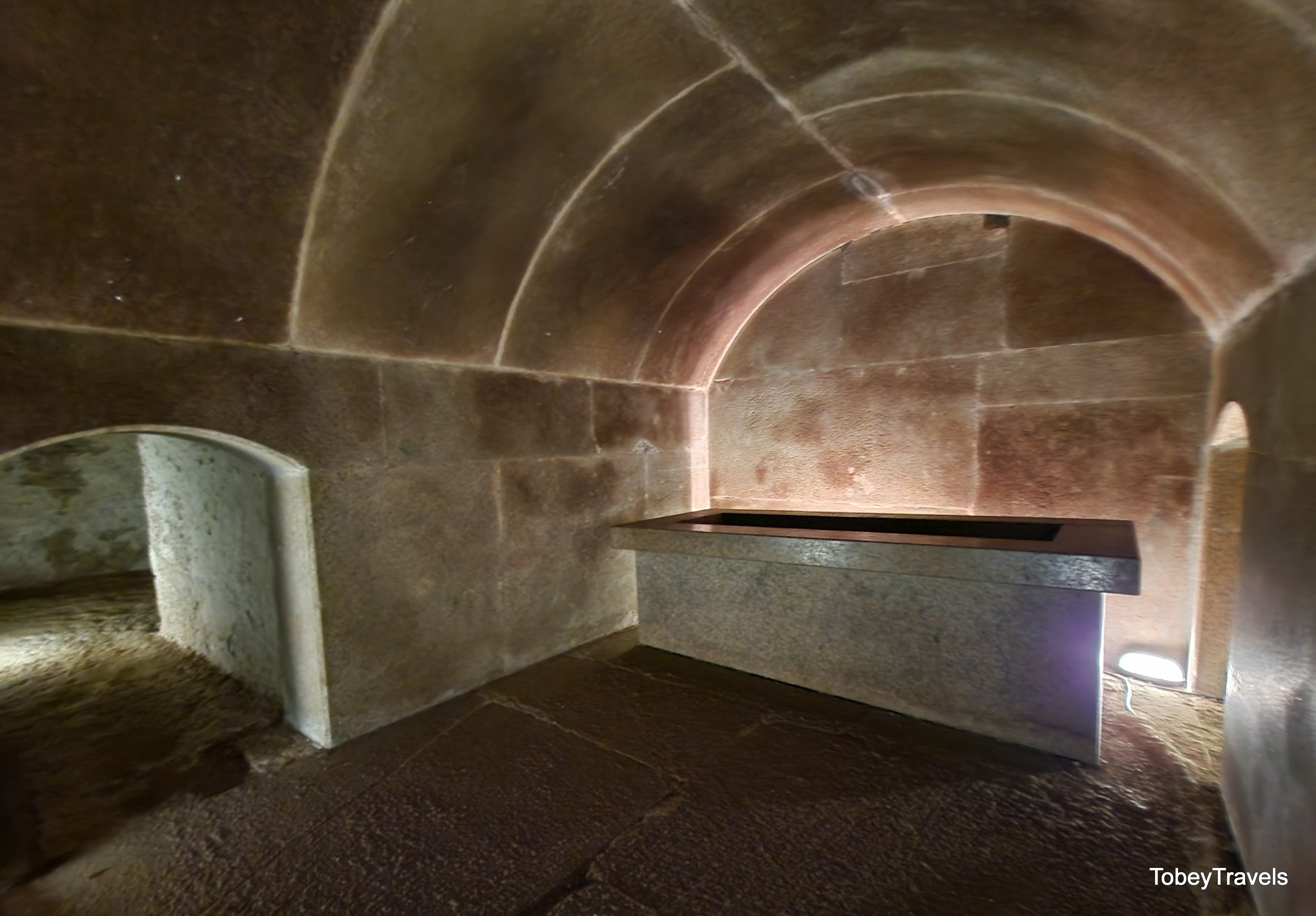
Senusret II's red granite sarcophagus in the burial chamber

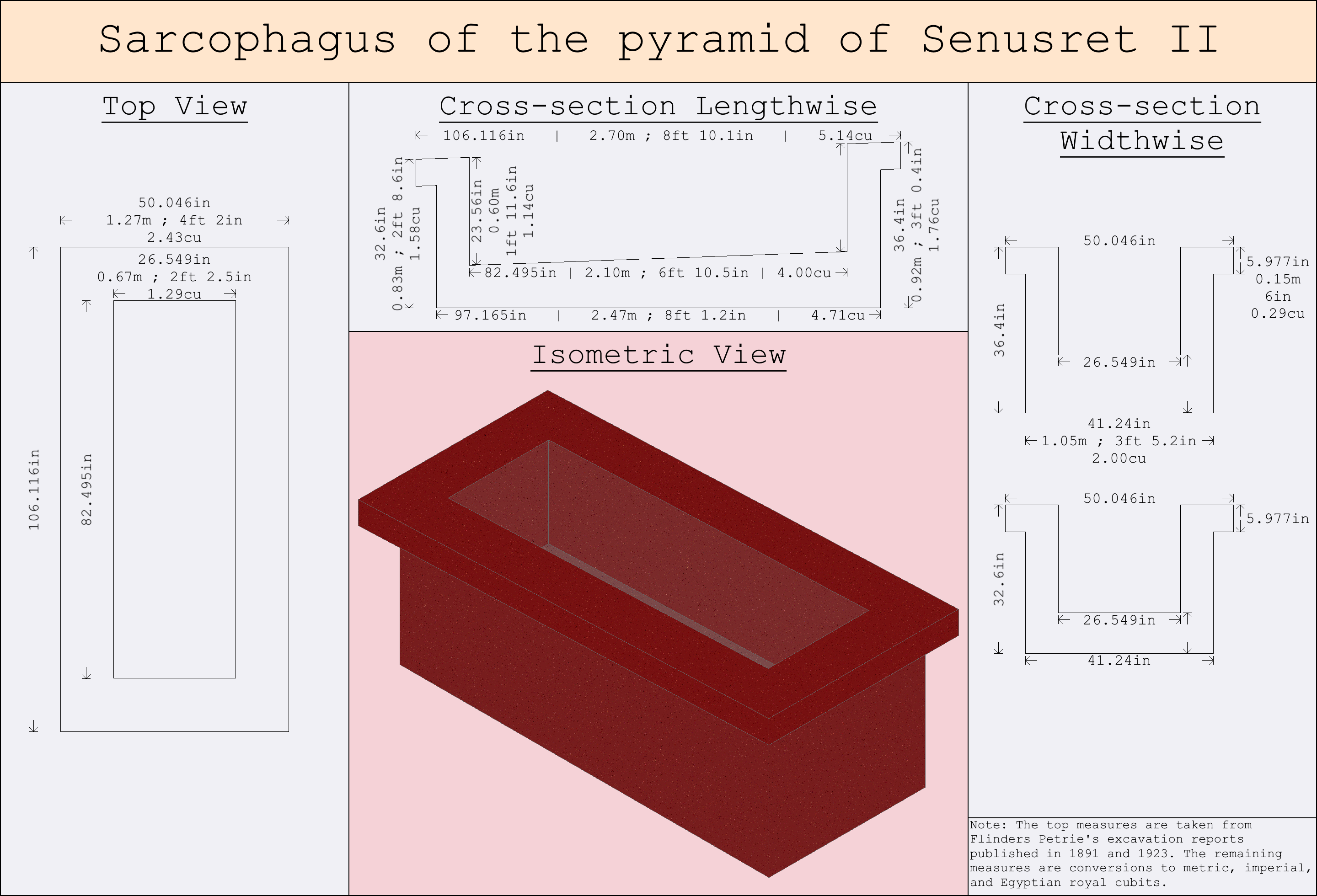
Schematic diagram with measurements of the sarcophagus

=== Mortuary temple ===
The pyramid had a small mortuary temple on its east side, but it was thoroughly destroyed during Ramesses II's reign preventing a reconstruction of its plan. A considerable number of relief fragments from the temple were recovered, including images of the king, inscriptions of his name, and painted wall chips depicting offerings made. There was also several pieces of red granite bearing carved hieroglyphs painted green that came from the doorways. To the temple's west, a chunk of inscribed grey granite was uncovered that Brunton speculates may have come from an altar originally in the temple. A pair of apparent foundation deposits were also found, one by the temple's southeast corner and another on its east–west axis, that contained pottery that had been arranged in the sand.

=== Causeway and valley temple ===
The complex had a wide open causeway, but it is unclear whether and how it interfaced with the mortuary temple or the pyramid enclosure, and it remains unexplored. There was also a valley temple, now destroyed, which Dieter Arnold speculates was not connected to the remainder of the complex based on its distance from the site. To the north, lay Senusret II's pyramid town named Ḥtp Sn-wsr-t meaning 'May Senusret be at peace' or 'Senusret is contented', but now known as 'Kahun'.

== Subsidiary structures ==
=== Tomb 7 ===
'Tomb 7' is the tomb of an unidentified princess of the Twelfth Dynasty. It lies west of the pyramid entrance 'tomb 10' and east of 'tomb 9', and shares the same basic structure, but has only a single level. Similarly to those tombs, it is accessed by a 8.13 m (26 ft 8 in) deep shaft that has a niche in the south wall near its base. North of this lies the antechamber, hidden behind a set of blocking stones. It has walls divided into two unclad sections and a floor that was originally paved. The west wall contained two niches: An upper niche with a vaulted roof and a lower niche that once hosted a burial, possibly for a servant. The east wall had a stepped rectangular niche and four round holes with an unknown function. To the north lies the burial chamber. It was originally closed off with limestone blocks, but these have been partially cleared by tomb robbers.

The whole burial chamber is lined with fine white limestone and contains a red granite sarcophagus seated atop a panelled projecting plinth imitating the enclosure wall of Djoser's step pyramid. The sarcophagus lid has a typical style with flat ends and a curved middle. It was found displaced, but undamaged. The inner coffins though had been removed and destroyed as evidenced by some fragments that were recovered from the shaft and pieces of a woman's skull that were found in the antechamber. Adjoining the burial chamber are the canopic recess to the east and the offering chamber to the northeast. The recess still contained the red granite canopic chest (Note: Measuring 0.79 m (2 ft 7 in) each side externally and 0.52 m (1 ft 8 in) each side internally.) which resembles the sarcophagus with flat ends and a curved middle. Inside the chest was a wooden box partitioned into four compartments that hosted the alabaster canopic jars. Whilst the box was found in fine condition suffering from only some partial decay in its base, the canopic jars it housed had been smashed and looted. Considering their purpose – to hold the embalmed organs of the deceased – it is unclear why the jars were a target for the looters. From one of the compartments, possibly the southwest one, a lung was recovered. The offering chamber was of typical pattern and contained remnants of funerary offerings.

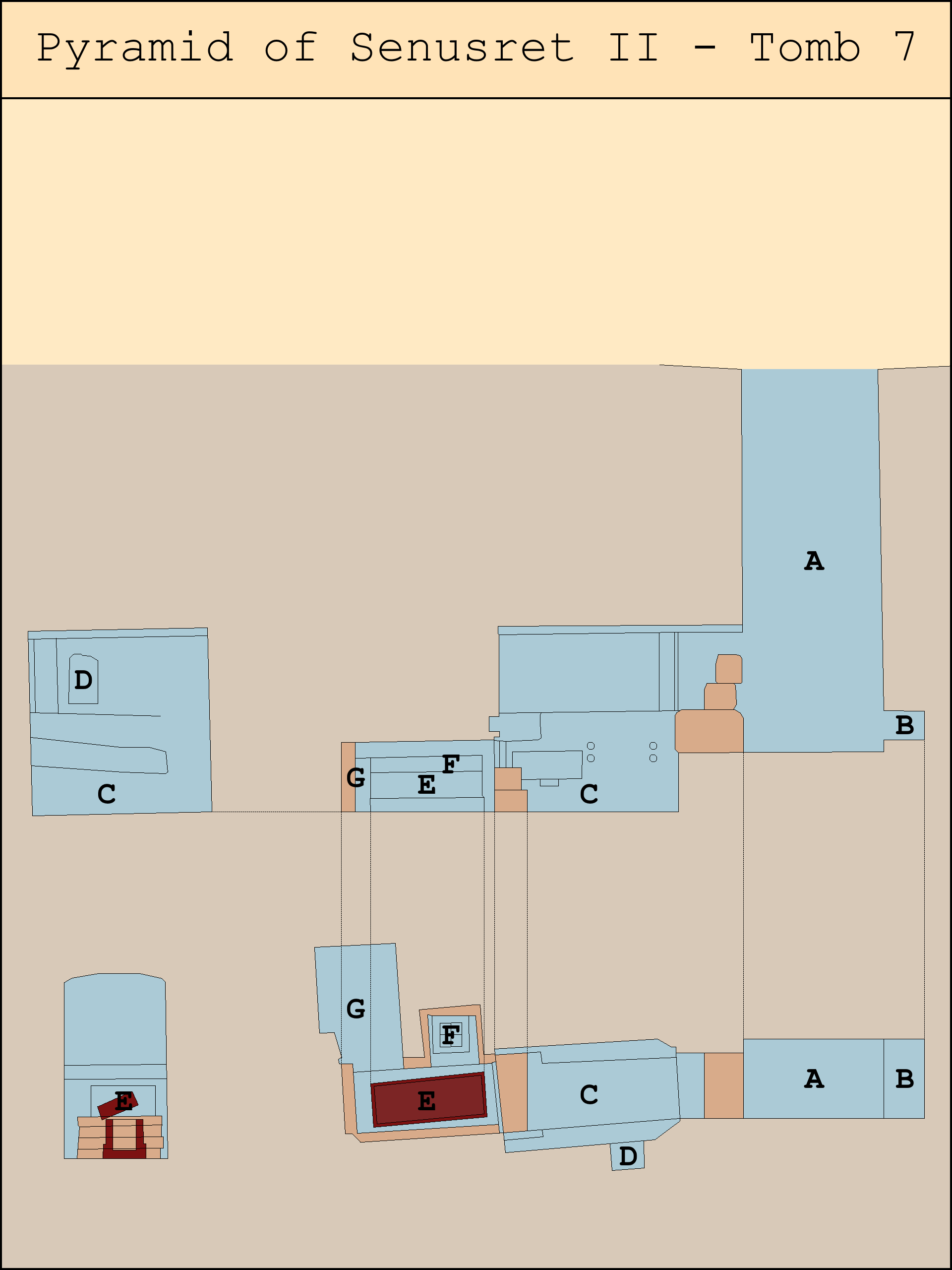
Plan of 'tomb 7' according to Hilda and Flinders Petrie in Lahun I in 1920 (Note: Tomb plan: A) shaft of 'tomb 7'; B) shaft recess; C) antechamber; D) subsidiary burial; E) burial chamber; F) canopic recess; and G) offering chamber.)

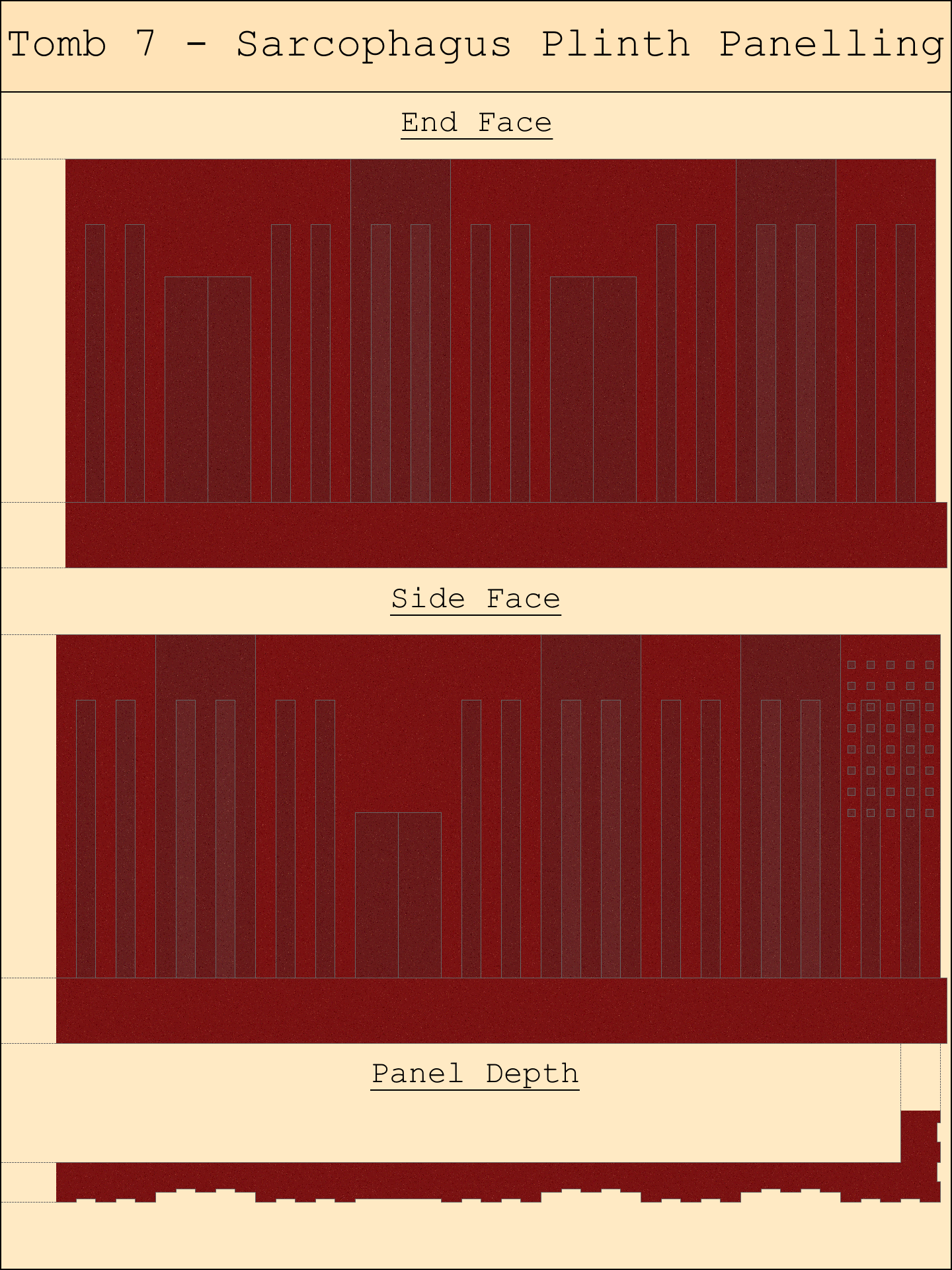
Arrangement of the panelled sarcophagus plinth bearing the design of the enclosure wall of Djoser's complex

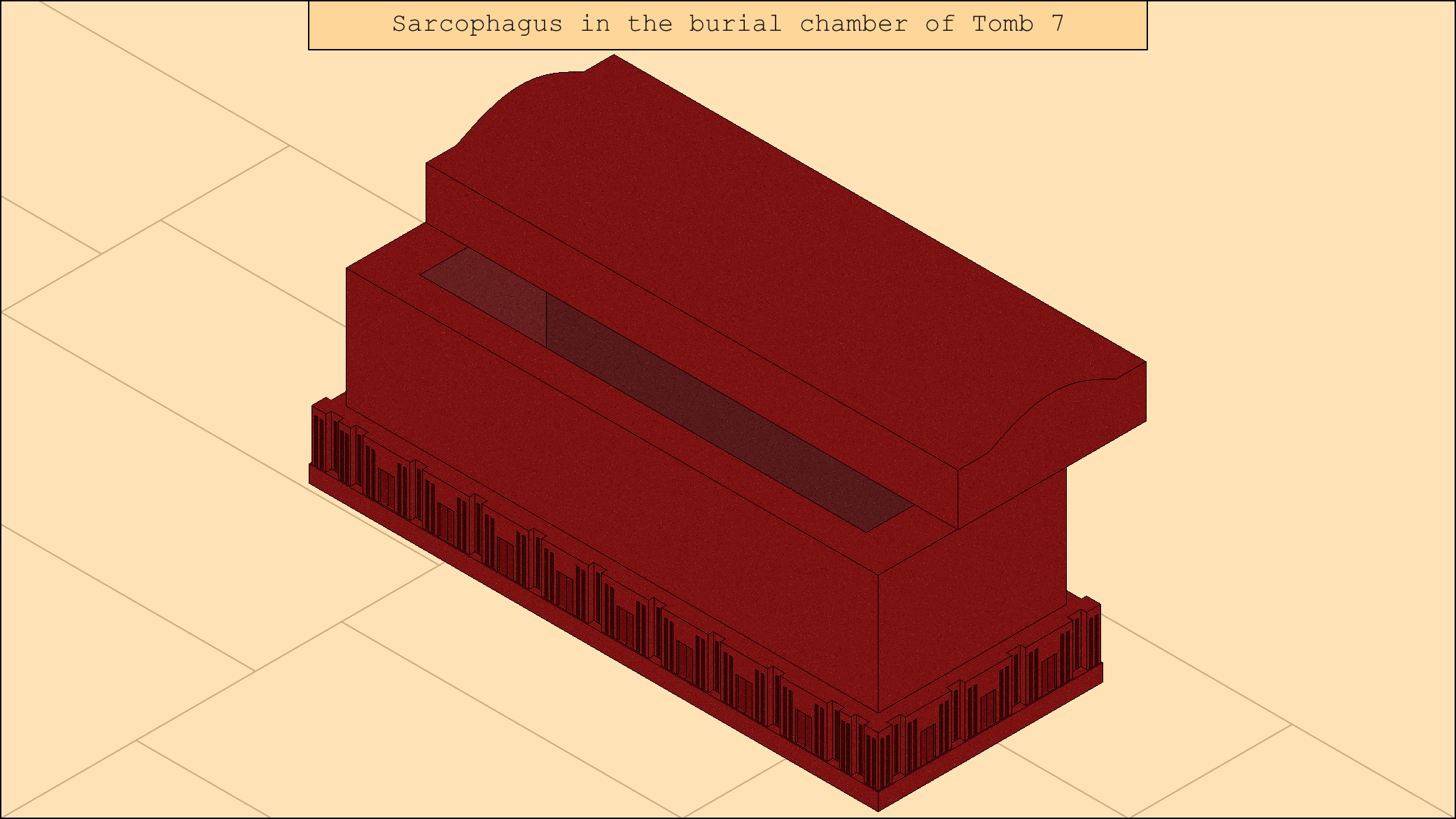
Isometric rendering of the unknown princess's sarcophagus that occupies the tomb's burial chamber

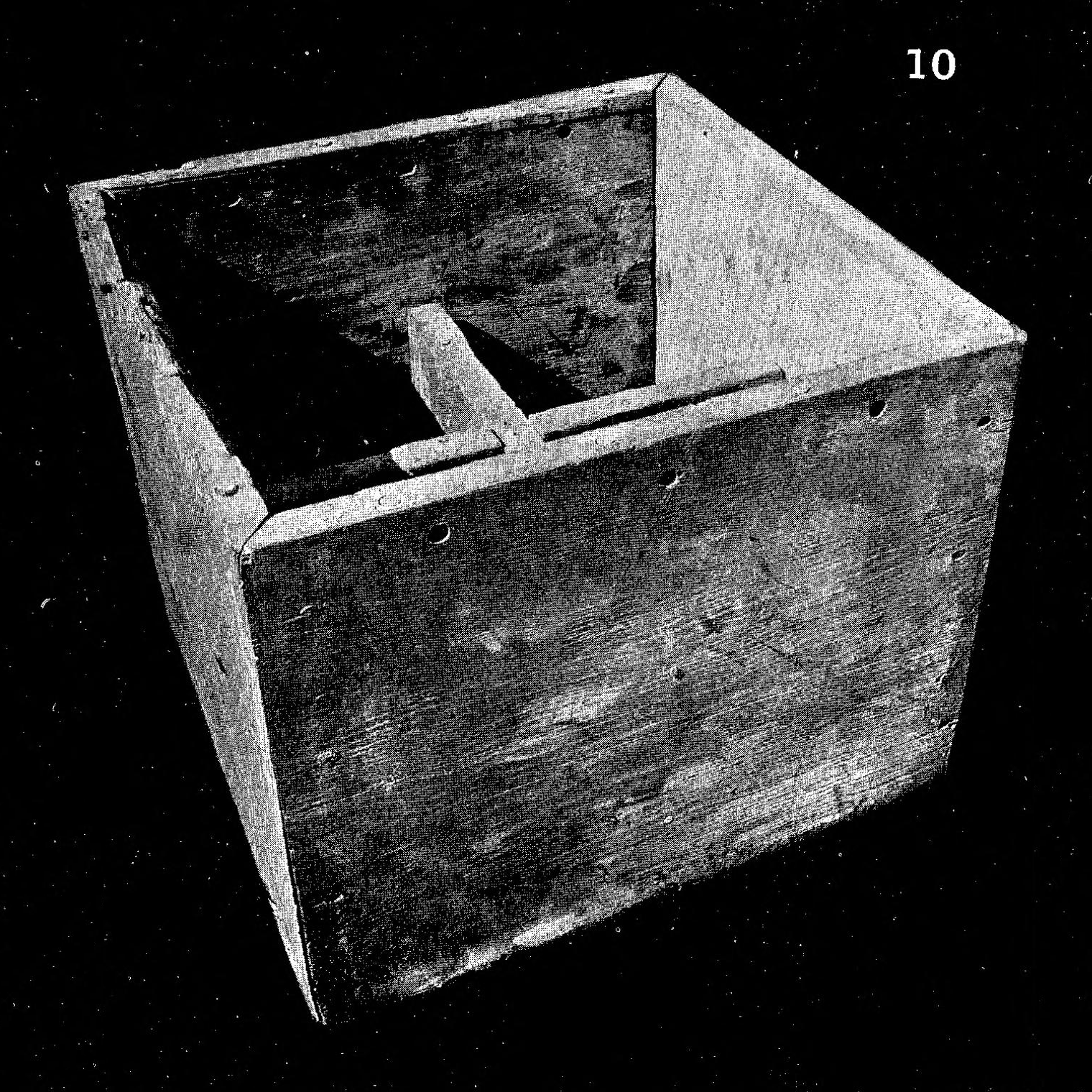
Wooden box recovered from the red granite canopic chest found in the recess

=== Tomb 8 of Sithathoriunet ===
Sithathoriunet's tomb is the easternmost of the four shaft tombs discovered on the pyramid's south side. It was built approximately 38 years after the death of Senusret II, during the reign of Amenemhat III. It is accessed through a 6.6 m (21 ft 8 in) deep shaft without an offering pit or recess. Fragments of bone were found here, but are of unknown provenance. The shaft opened into a 3.5 m (11 ft 6 in) long antechamber with walls separated into two sections. The upper shelfed section has a statue niche, while the lower section contains a deep recess in which the 'treasure of Illahun' was discovered. The statue niche contained a few miscellaneous items and part of a woman's pelvis bone. The antechambers walls were left as bare rock and the roof had largely collapsed. To the north is the burial chamber clad with limestone masonry, which was discovered opened, with fragments of the original limestone blocking stones scattered throughout the antechamber.

The burial chamber was nearly filled by the sarcophagus, leaving barely enough room for a person to enter. The sarcophagus is of red granite that stands upon an undecorated plinth and is covered by a lid with flat ends and curved middle. The quality of workmanship is comparatively poor, particularly considering the ornate sarcophagus in 'tomb 7'. The tomb's plunderers had pushed the lid to the wall and broken a hole through it to evacuate the sarcophagus of its contents, of which fragments of wood, presumed to be from the coffins, and pieces of gold foil were all that remained. In the vicinity of the sarcophagus, a piece of black granite with a partial inscription bearing a woman's titles was found. The titles known are sꜣt-nsw meaning 'king's daughter', ḥm.t-nsw meaning 'king's wife', and ẖnmt-nfr-ḥḏ.t meaning 'united with the White Crown'. However, the identity of the person to whom the titles belonged is unknown. The only other finds within the chamber were a single Middle Kingdom period pot and a bead.

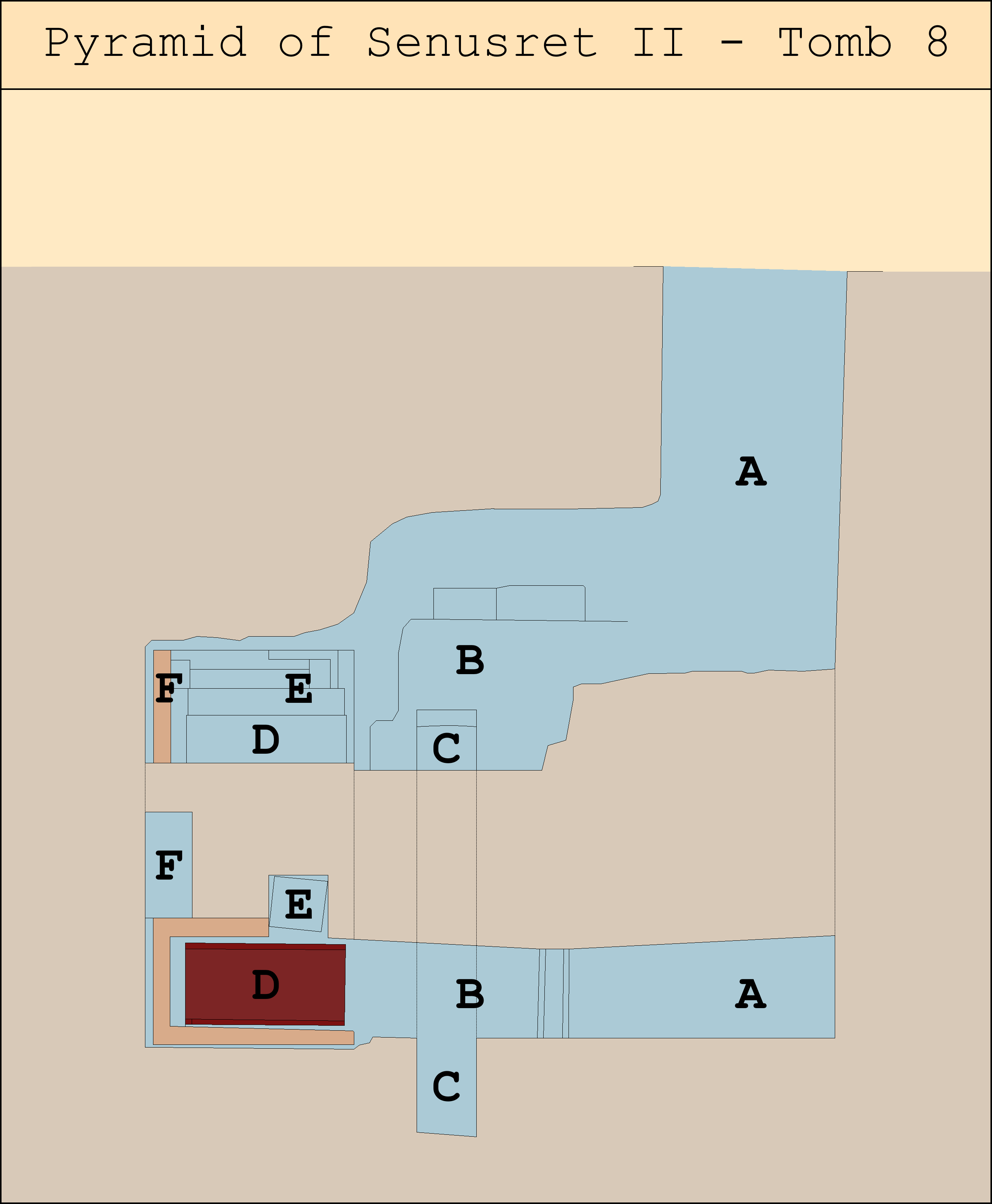
Plan of 'tomb 8' of Sithathoriunet as according to Hilda and Flinders Petrie in Lahun I in 1920 (Note: Tomb plan: A) shaft of 'tomb 8'; B) antechamber; C) treasure recess; D) burial chamber; E) canopic recess; and F) offering chamber (very rough reconstruction).)

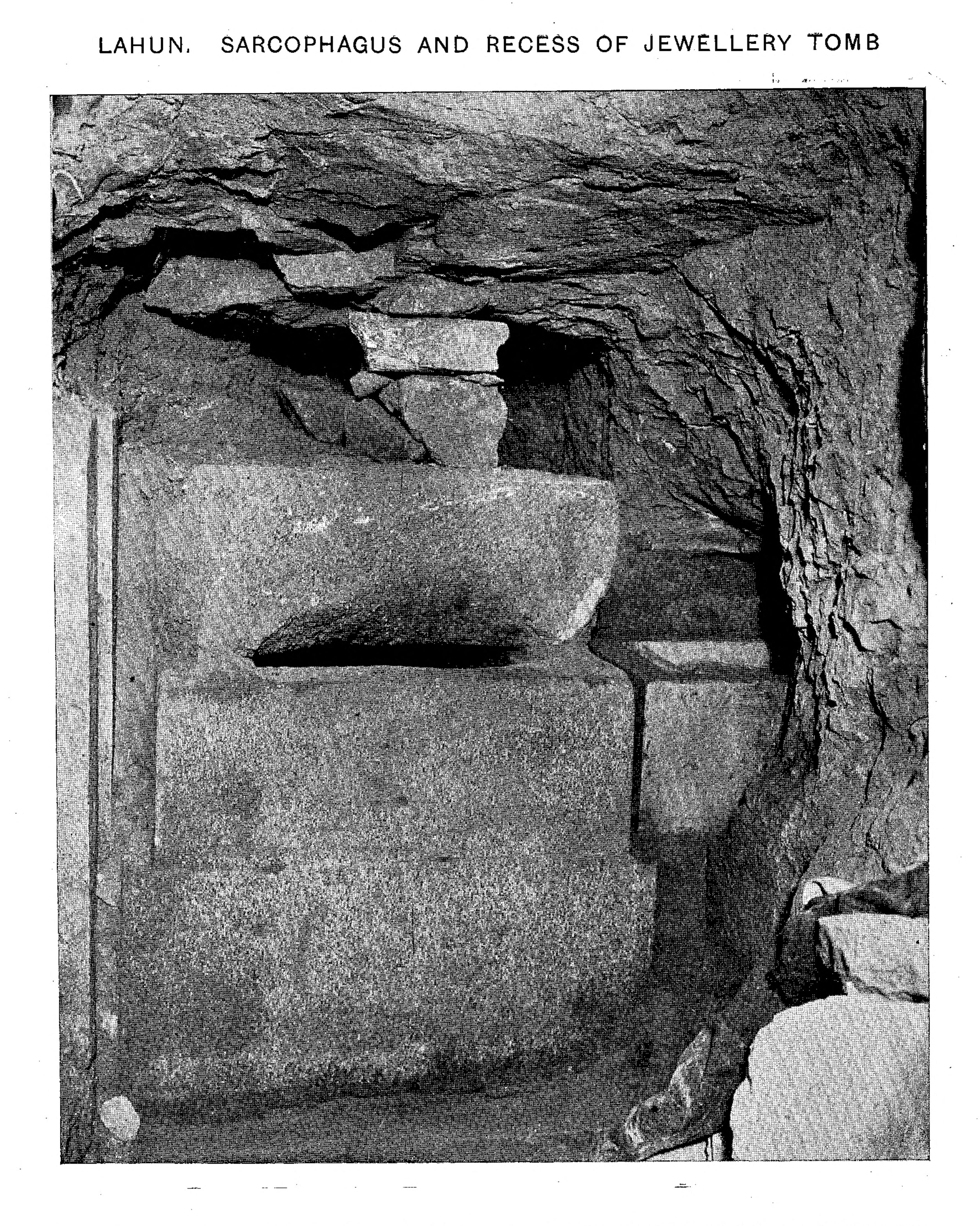
The burial chamber of Sithathoriunet, with the sarcophagus in the centre and the canopic chest in the centre right

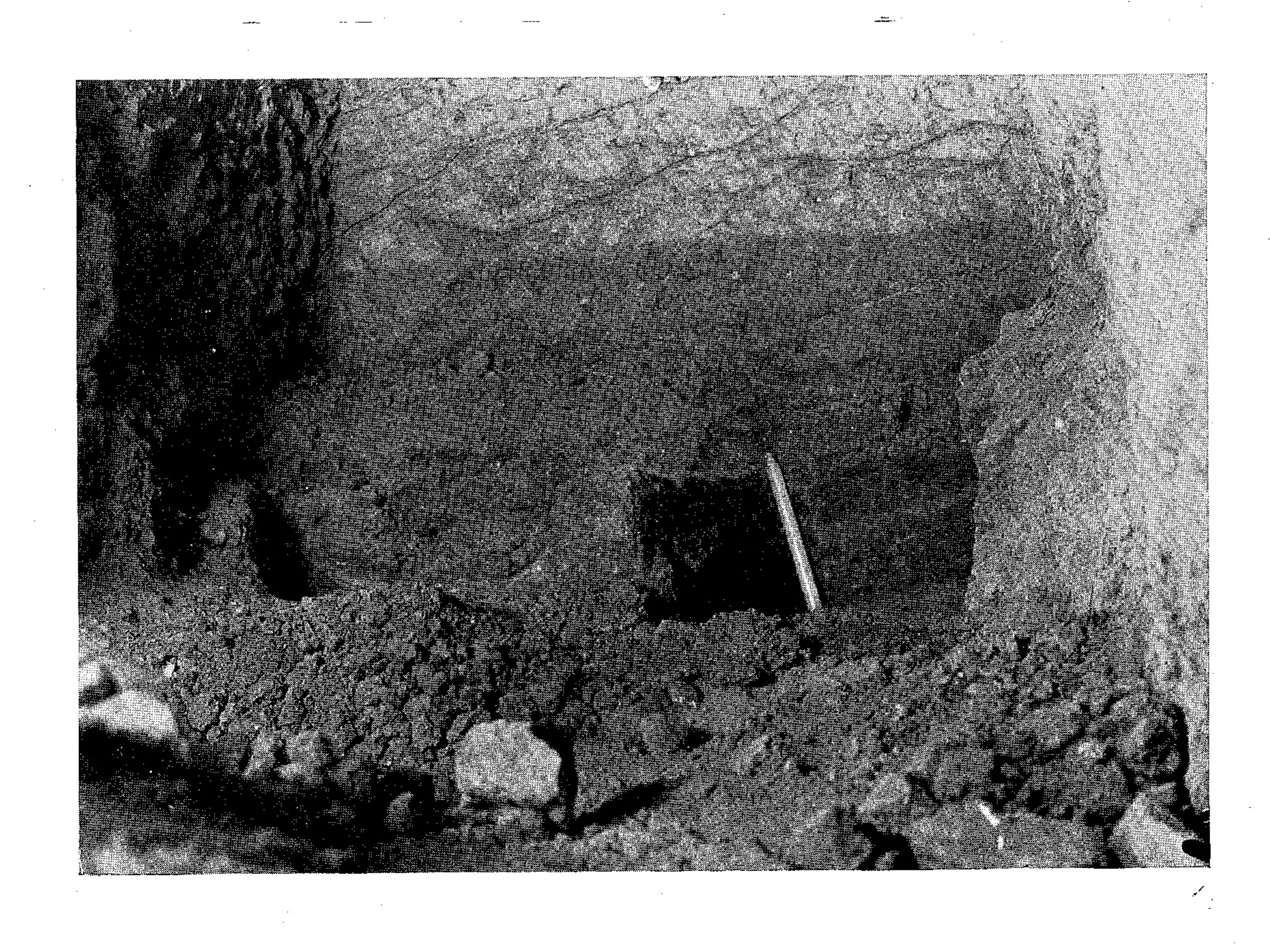
The recess which held the 'treasure of Lahun' in Sithathoriunet's tomb after being cleared by Guy Brunton

Adjoining the chamber were the canopic recess, with the canopic chest, and an offering chamber which was barely perceptible due to a ceiling collapse. The canopic chest was made of smoothed white limestone with a curved lid. It contained a wooden box, badly decayed, with a set of four alabaster canopic jars in pristine condition. They did not contain any organs, only cedar pitch, sand, and mud. The clearing of the offering chamber led to the finding of an alabaster jar of finest quality and in perfect condition, with the only damage being minor chipping of the lid. The jar is inscribed with Sithathoriunet's name and identifies her as a royal daughter. Other items recovered from this room included various beads, bones of offered oxen and birds, scraps of copper and fragments of pottery.

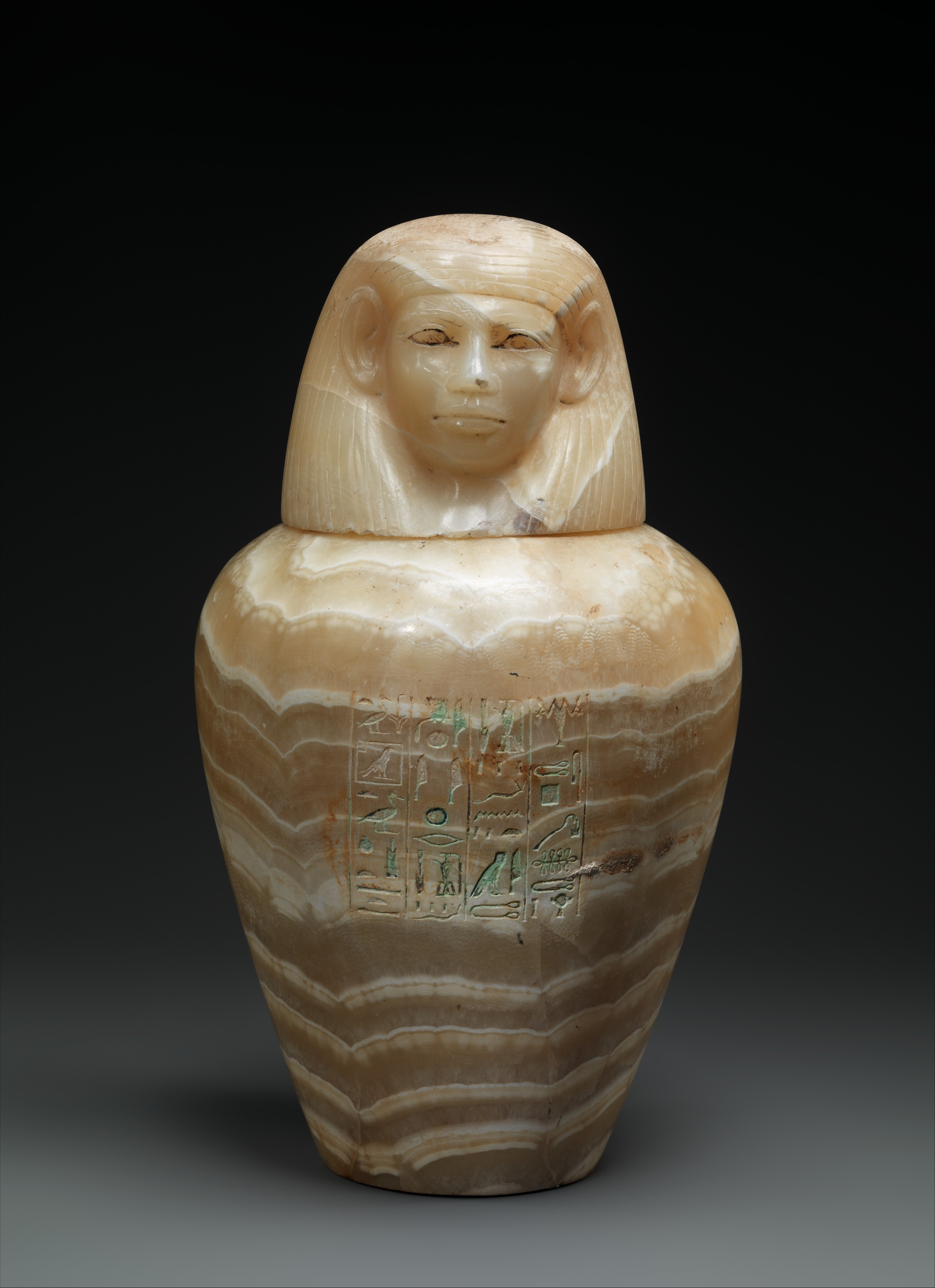
One of Sithathoriunet's canopic jars, bearing the visage of Qebehsenuef, one of Horus's four sons (Note: The jar bears the inscription in four columns (read right to left): Srḳt śtp-sꜣ ṯ ḥr Ḳbḥ-snw-f nty ỉm ṯ ỉmꜣḫy ḫr Ḳbḥ-snw-f sꜣt-nsw Sꜣt-ḥwt-ḥr-ỉwnt mꜣꜥt ḫrw translating to 'Serket cast thy protection upon Qebehsenuef who is in thee; be honoured by Qebehsenuef, King's Daughter, Sithathoriunet, true of voice'.)

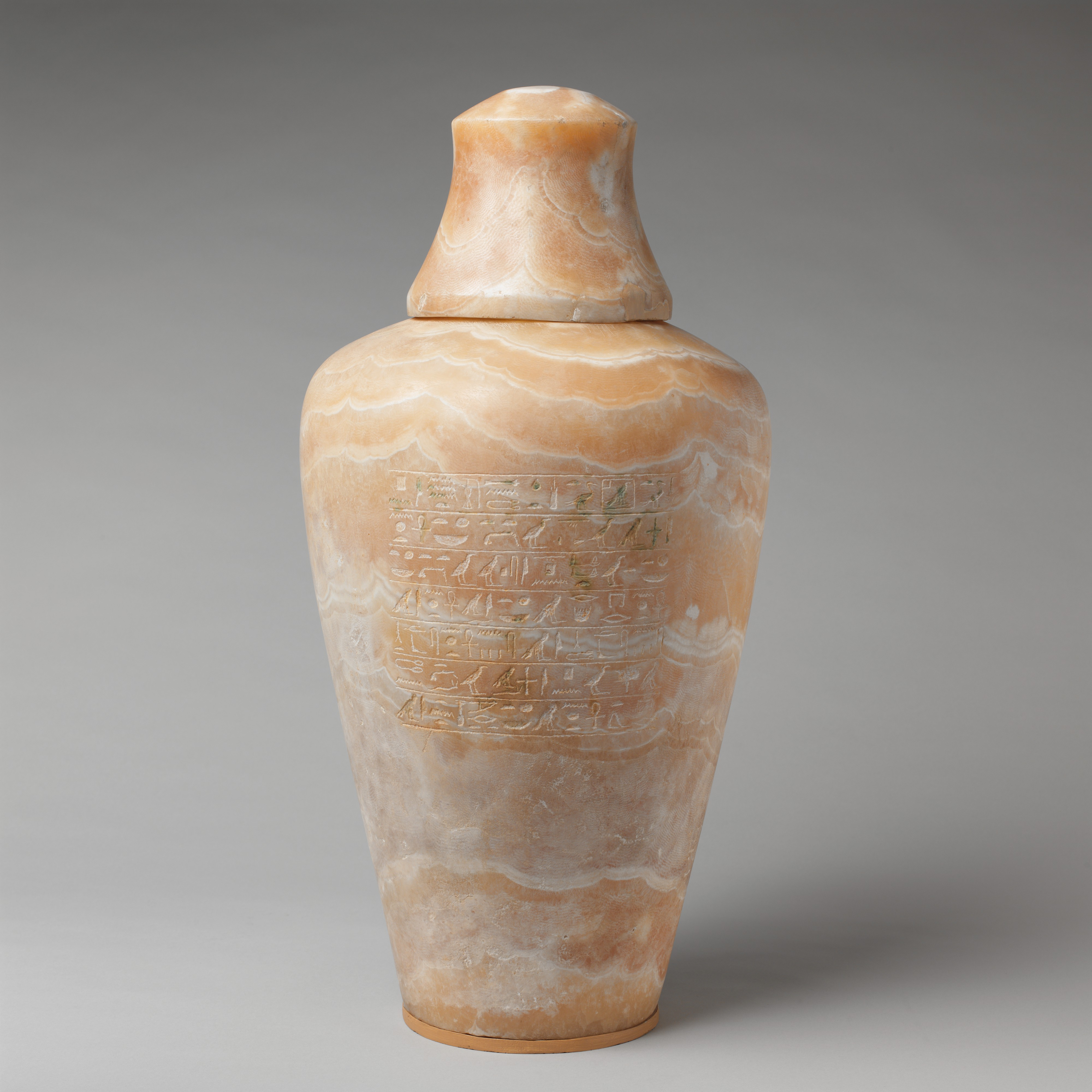
The exquisite banded alabaster jar discovered in the offering chamber of the tomb

The recess containing the tomb's riches was inset from about the centre of the antechamber's west wall. It had been cut about 1.6 m (5 ft 3 in) deep and had a sloped ceiling about 1 m (3 ft 3 in) high. It was two-thirds full with mud at the time of its excavation which had to be carefully cleared to reveal its contents. The treasure was originally held in five wooden chests stored within the recess that have since decayed, alongside other organic material, such as the threads of the necklaces and wigs of hair, and tarnishable materials, such as silver and copper fittings.

=== Tomb 9 ===
'Tomb 9' is the westernmost of the four shaft tombs discovered on the pyramid's south side. It has two entrances: a 11.1 m (36 ft 5 in) deep shaft seated directly above the tomb, and a long 1.9 m (6 ft 3 in) wide staircase that descends from the west to meet the shaft at its base before turning north towards the tombs. The upper tomb is separated from the staircase by a second shaft whose roof has collapsed that leads to the lower level. It comprises the main burial chamber with a canopic recess to the east and an offering chamber to the northeast, and a secondary chamber underneath it, which may have been the originally intended burial chamber as the staircase, had it continued its path, would have met this lower floor. This tomb was never completed as evidenced by the state of preparation of the walls.

The second shaft descends a further 4 m (13 ft) before opening on its west into a rock-cut chamber with a 12.2 m (40 ft) long corridor leading to the lower tomb. The collapse of the roof had left debris all through it. The end of the corridor is used to form an antechamber which leads immediately into the burial chamber with a canopic recess on its south, rather than the typical east, and the offering chamber in the northeast. The ante– and burial– chambers are clad, paved, and roofed with fine white limestone, but the other chambers remain bare. The ceiling in the burial chamber has had a slight curve to mimic a vaulted roof carved into it. Much of the limestone pavement has been looted by tomb robbers who also left behind 'scrawls', as Brunton described them, on the ceiling. The tomb appears to be the oldest of the four, as the burial chamber is the only one which also contains a 'coffin trench', similar to those of the princesses's tombs at the pyramid of Amenemhat II in Dahshur.

There were very few finds in either of the two tombs and it does not appear that the tombs had been completed or used for a burial during the Twelfth Dynasty. The few pottery pieces that were recovered predominantly date to the Twenty-second to Twenty-fifth dynasties, with a few pieces from the Nineteenth and earlier dynasties which may have arrived in the tomb through its later re-use as a burial site, though neither any fragments of a coffin nor of a person were recovered.

== See also ==
- List of Egyptian pyramids
- Egyptian pyramid construction techniques

== Sources ==
- Arnold, Dieter (2003). The Encyclopaedia of Ancient Egyptian Architecture. London: I.B Tauris & Co Ltd. ISBN 978-1-86064-465-8.
- Brunton, Guy (1920). Lahun I: The Treasure. London: British School of Archaeology in Egypt & Bernard Quaritch.
- Dodson, Aidan; Hilton, Dyan (2004). The Complete Royal Families of Ancient Egypt. London: Thames & Hudson. ISBN 978-0-500-05128-3.
- Edwards, Iorwerth (1993) [1947]. The pyramids of Egypt. London: Penguin Group. ISBN 0-14-013634-7.
- Frey, Rosa A. (2001). "Illahun". In Redford, Donald B. (ed.). The Oxford Encyclopedia of Ancient Egypt, Volume 2. Oxford: Oxford University Press. pp. 150–151. ISBN 978-0-19-510234-5.
- Grimal, Nicolas (1992). A History of Ancient Egypt. Translated by Ian Shaw. Oxford: Blackwell publishing. ISBN 978-0-631-19396-8.
- Hayes, William (1978). The Scepter of Egypt: A Background for the Study of the Egyptian Antiquities in the Metropolitan Museum of Art, Part 1. From the Earliest Times to the End of the Middle Kingdom. New York: Metropolitan Museum of Art. ISBN 0-87099-190-6.
- Hölzl, Christian (1999). "Lahun, pyramid complex of Senusret II". In Bard, Kathryn (ed.). Encyclopedia of the archaeology of ancient Egypt. London; New York: Routledge. pp. 516–517. ISBN 978-0-203-98283-9.
- Ilin-Tomich, Alexander (2024). "Persons and Names of the Middle Kingdom". Johannes Gutenberg Universität Mainz. Johannes Gutenberg Universität Mainz.
- Lehner, Mark (2008). The Complete Pyramids. New York: Thames & Hudson. ISBN 978-0-500-28547-3.
- Lilyquist, Christine; Dorman, Peter; Russman, Edna R. (1983). "Egyptian Art". The Metropolitan Museum of Art Bulletin. 41 (3). New York: Metropolitan Museum of Art. ISSN 0026-1521.
- Patch, Diana Craig (2015). "Catalogue Entries for '52A, B. Two Boxes of Sithathoryunet', '54A, B. Pectoral of Princess Sithathoryunet', '55A–F. Sets of Bracelets and anklets of Princess Sithathoryunet', '56. Cowrie Shell Girdle of Princess Sithathoryunet', and '57A–E. Feline-Headed Girdle, Anklets, and Bracelets of Princess Sithathoryunet'". In Oppenheim, Adela; Arnold, Dorothea; Arnold, Dieter; Yamamoto, Kei (eds.). Ancient Egypt Transformed: The Middle Kingdom. New York: The Metropolitan Museum of Art. pp. 96–119 [110–111, 114–119]. ISBN 978-1-58839-564-1.
- Petrie, William Matthew Flinders (1891). Illahun, Kahun and Gurob: 1889–1890. London: David Nutt.
- Petrie, William Matthew Flinders; Brunton, Guy; Murray, Margaret Alice (1923). Lahun II. London: British School of Archaeology in Egypt & Bernard Quaritch.
- Roehrig, Catharine H. (2015). "Catalogue Entries for '53A, B. Cosmetic Vessels of Princess Sithathoryunet'". In Oppenheim, Adela; Arnold, Dorothea; Arnold, Dieter; Yamamoto, Kei (eds.). Ancient Egypt Transformed: The Middle Kingdom. New York: The Metropolitan Museum of Art. pp. 96–119 [112]. ISBN 978-1-58839-564-1.
- Shaw, Ian, ed. (2004). The Oxford History of Ancient Egypt. Oxford: Oxford University Press. ISBN 978-0-19-815034-3.
- Simpson, William Kelly (2001). "Twelfth Dynasty". In Redford, Donald B. (ed.). The Oxford Encyclopedia of Ancient Egypt, Volume 3. Oxford: Oxford University Press. pp. 453–457. ISBN 978-0-19-510234-5.
- Stünkel, Isabel (2015). "Royal Women: Ladies of the Two Lands". In Oppenheim, Adela; Arnold, Dorothea; Arnold, Dieter; Yamamoto, Kei (eds.). Ancient Egypt Transformed: The Middle Kingdom. New York: The Metropolitan Museum of Art. pp. 92–119. ISBN 978-1-58839-564-1.
- "The Collection". Met Museum. Metropolitan Museum of Art.
- Verner, Miroslav (2001). The Pyramids: The Mystery, Culture and Science of Egypt's Great Monuments. New York: Grove Press. ISBN 978-0-8021-1703-8.
- Vyse, Howard; Perring, John Shae (1842). Operations carried on at the Pyramids of Gizeh in 1837. Vol. III. London: John Weale, High Holborn and G. W. Nickisson, 215 Regent Street. OCLC 931237769.
- Winlock, Herbert (1934). The Treasure of El Lāhūn. New York: Metropolitan Museum of Art.
