= Sithathoriunet =

Ancient Egyptian princess of the 12th Dynasty

- King's Daughter
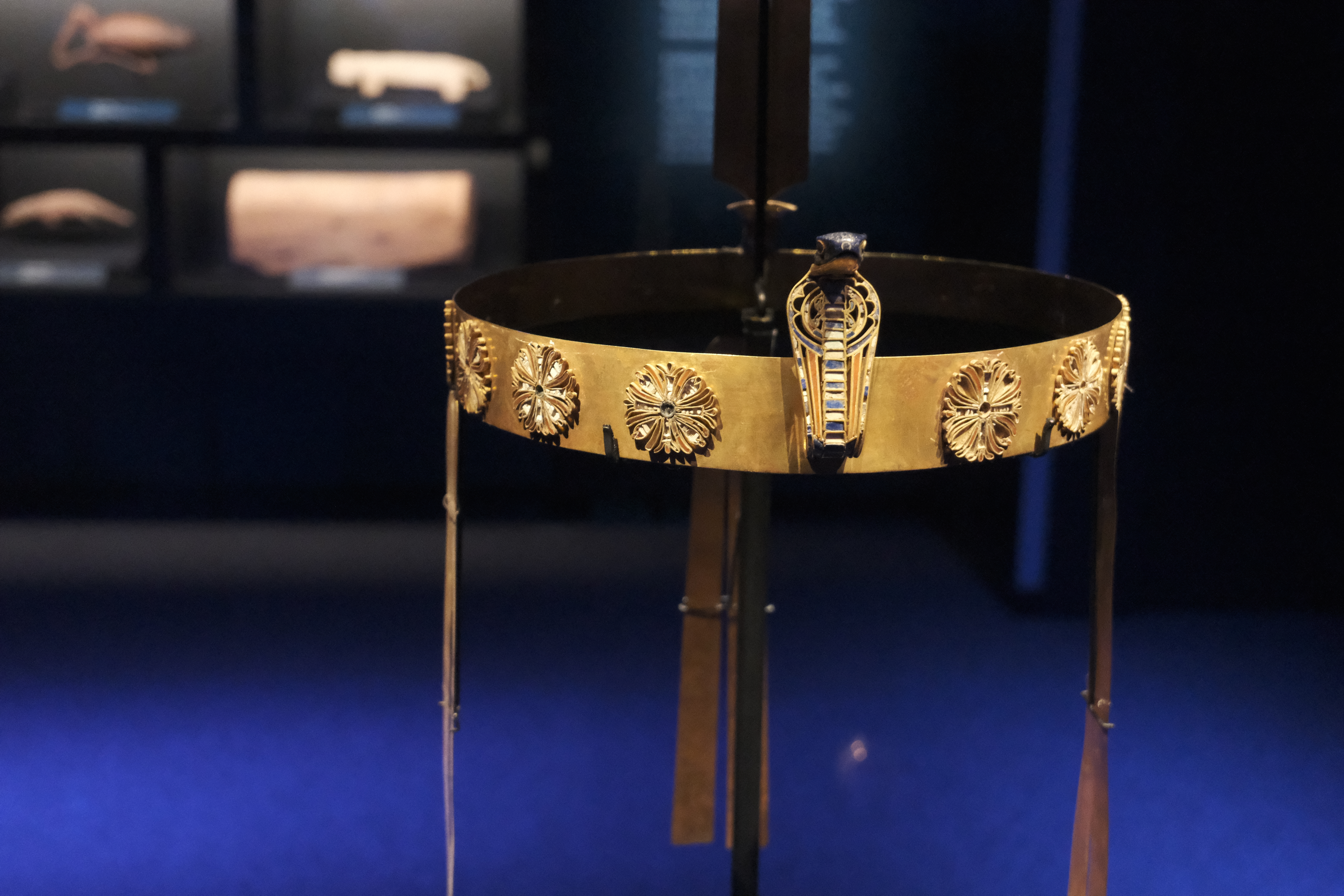
- Sithathoriunet's diadem or crown
- Burial: tomb at the Pyramid of Senusret II
- Dynasty: Twelfth
- Father: Senusret II
- Religion: Ancient Egyptian religion

Sithathoriunet in hieroglyphs
O10 G39 X1 O28 W24 X1
Sithathoriunet
Sꜣt-Ḥwt-Ḥr-Jwnt
Daughter of Hathor of Dendera

Sithathoriunet (Egyptian: Sꜣt-Ḥwt-Ḥr-Jwnt, lit. 'daughter of Hathor of Dendera') was an ancient Egyptian king's daughter (sꜣt-nsw) of the Twelfth Dynasty, during the Middle Kingdom period. She is mainly known from her burial at El Lahun in which a treasure trove of jewellery was found.

== Family ==
She was possibly a daughter of king Senusret II, since her burial site was found next to his pyramid. This would make her one of five known children and one of three daughters of Senusret II, alongside Senusret III, Senusretseneb, Itakayt and Nofret.

== Burial ==
At Lahun, the Tomb of Sihathoriunet is Tomb 8 in burial complex of the Pyramid of Senusret II. She most likely died during the reign of Amenemhat III, since objects bearing his name were found in her tomb.

=== Burial goods ===
The tomb was excavated in 1914 by Flinders Petrie and Guy Brunton. It had previously been robbed in antiquity, but a niche in the burial site escaped the looters' attention. In this niche, remains of several boxes were found along with their contents, which included jewellery and cosmetic objects, such as razors, a mirror and vases. Her name and titles survived on canopic jars and an alabaster vessel found in her tomb. The discovered jewellery is considered to be among the highest quality ever found in an ancient Egyptian tomb. These finds included two pectorals, one with the praenomen of Senusret II, and the other with the name of Amenemhat III, and a crown and bracelets inscribed with the praenomen of Amenemhat III. The majority of the objects are made of cloisonné gold inlaid with precious stones. Most of the finds are currently located in the Metropolitan Museum of Art in New York; the crown and the pectoral of Amenemhat III are in the Egyptian Museum in Cairo.

== Gallery ==
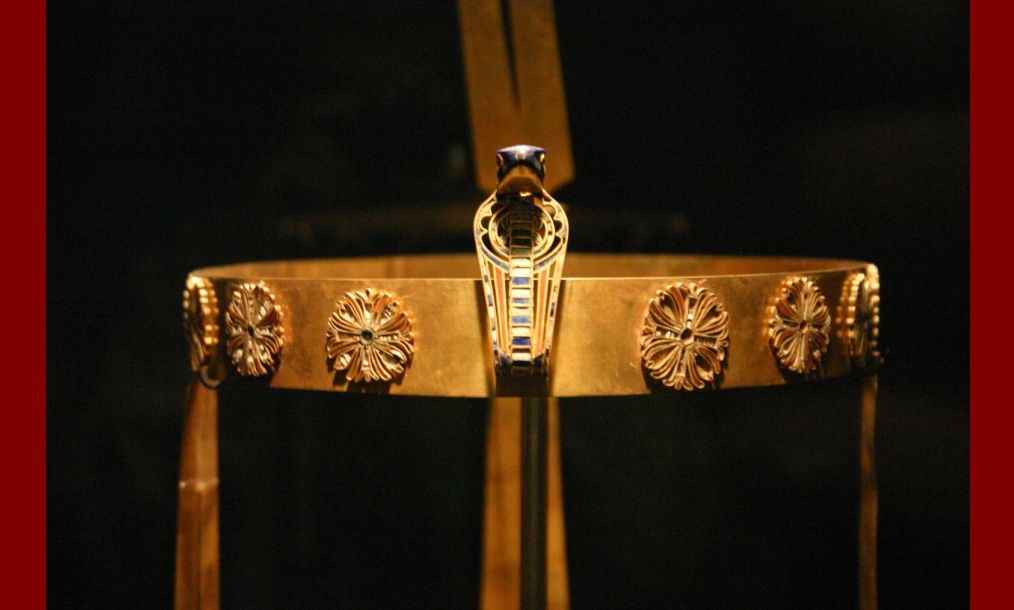
Crown of Sithathoriunet, Egyptian Museum in Cairo

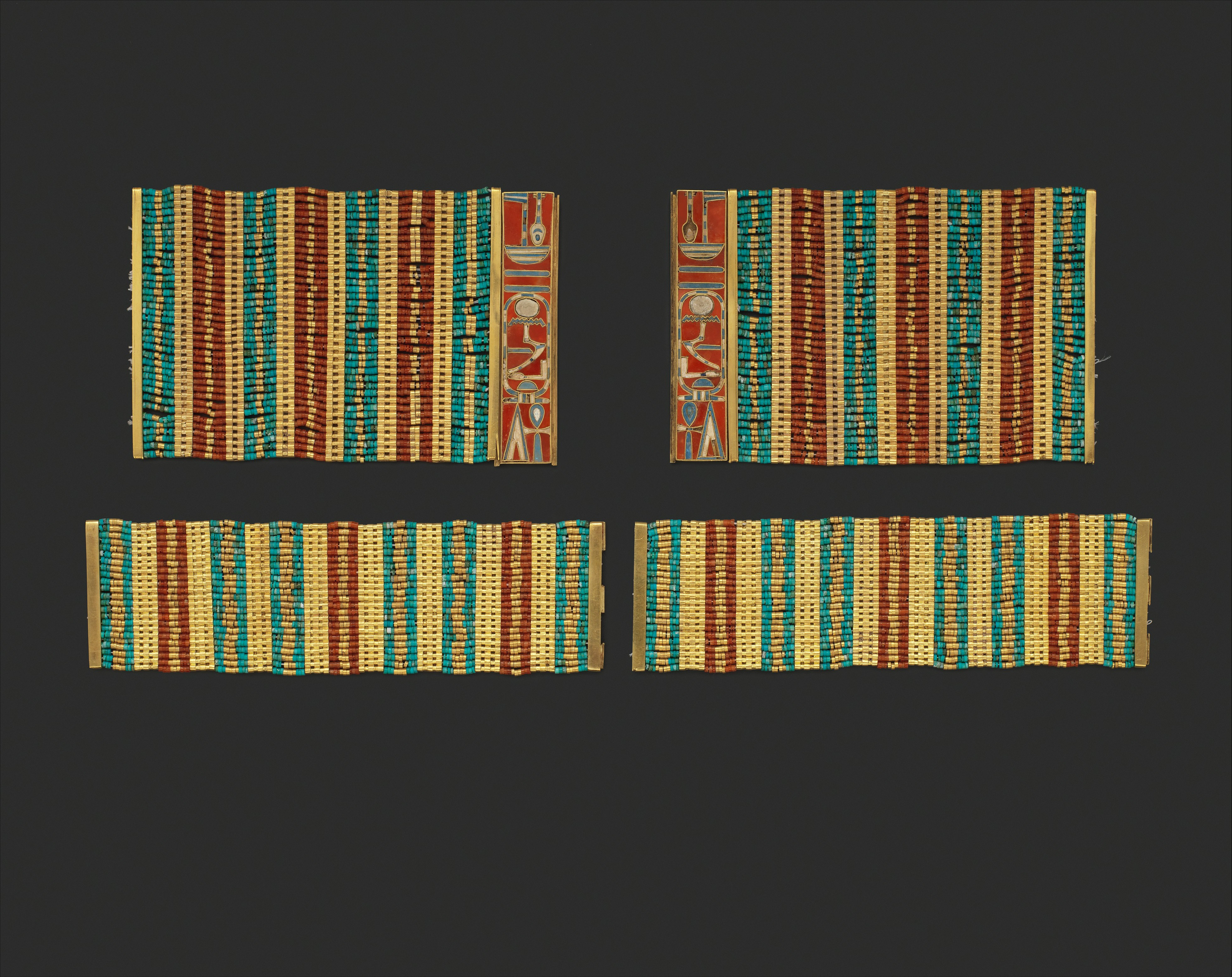
Bracelet of Sithathoriunet, The Met in New York City

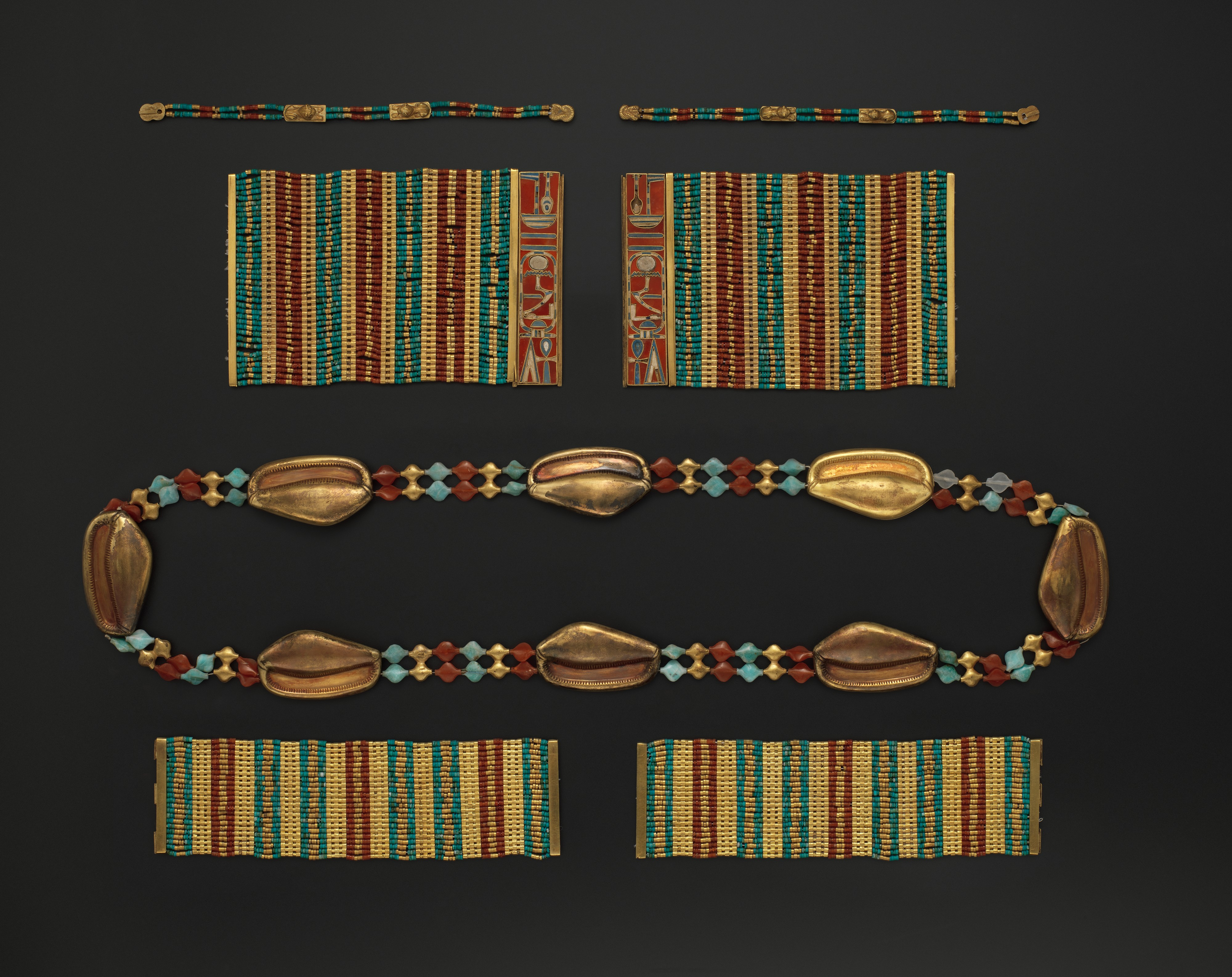
Cowrie shell girdle, lion bracelets, bracelets with the name of Amenemhat III, and anklets of Princess Sithathoriunet, The Met

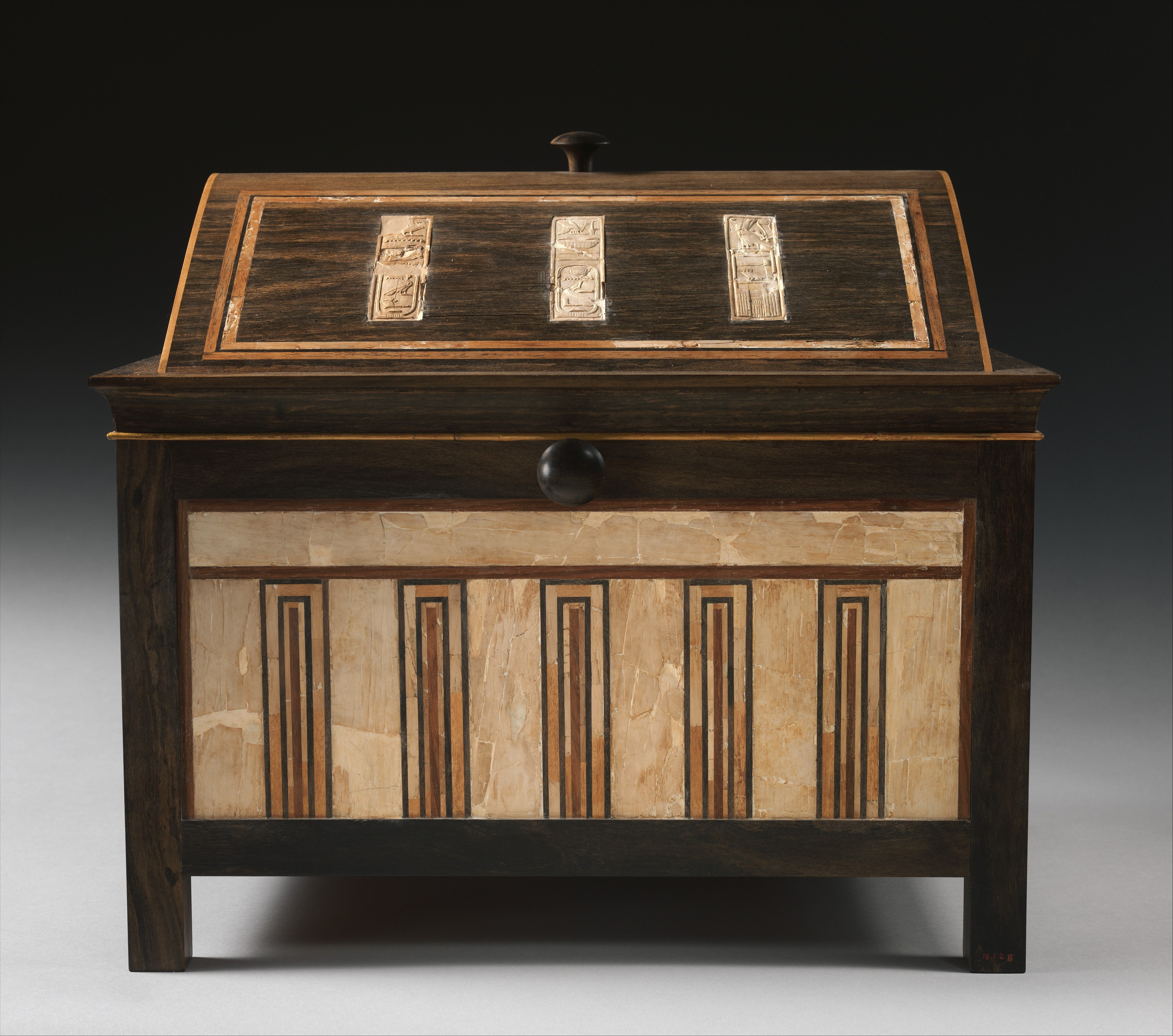
Box for cosmetic vessels of Sithathoriunet, The Met

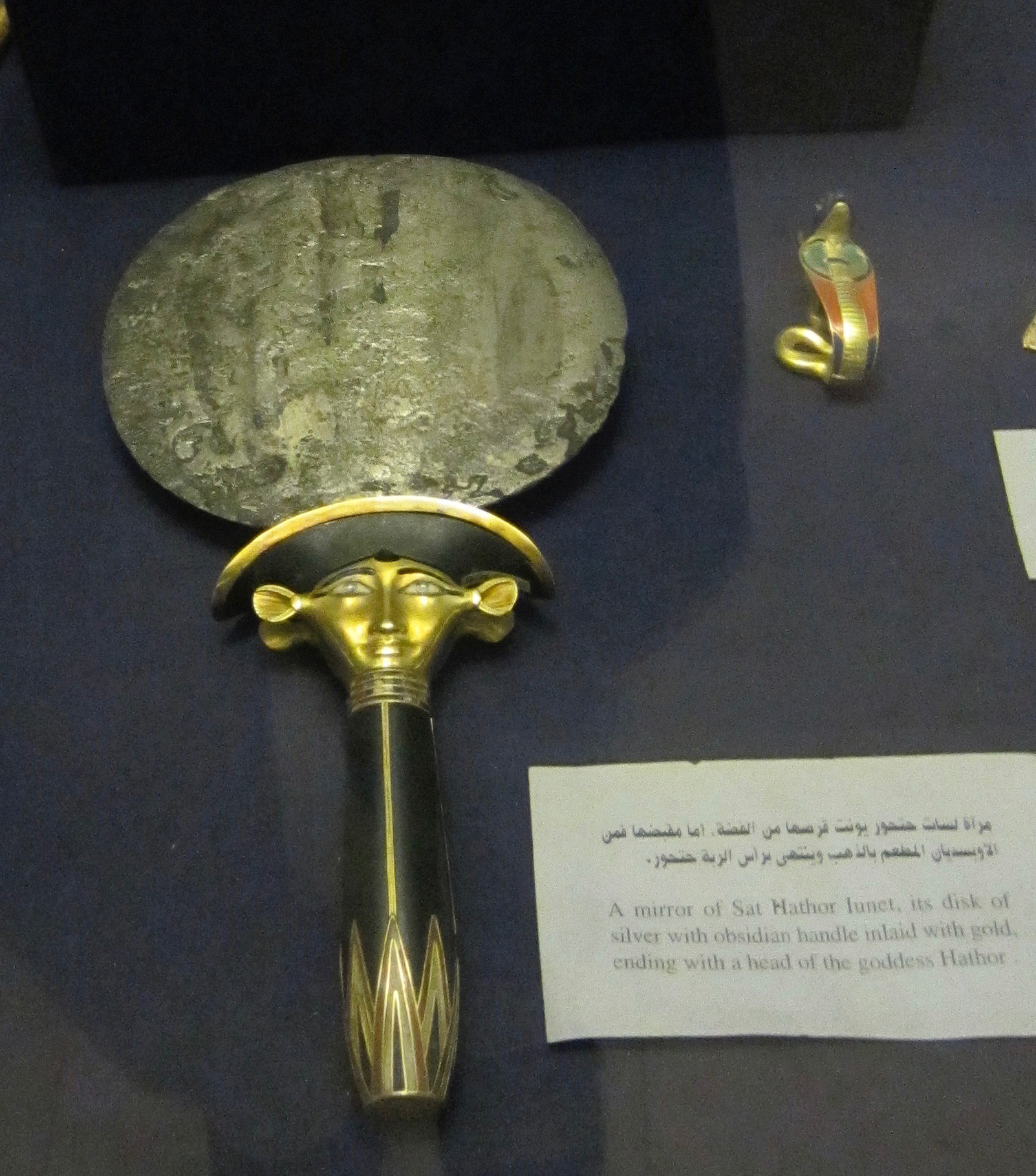
Silver mirror of Sithathoriunet

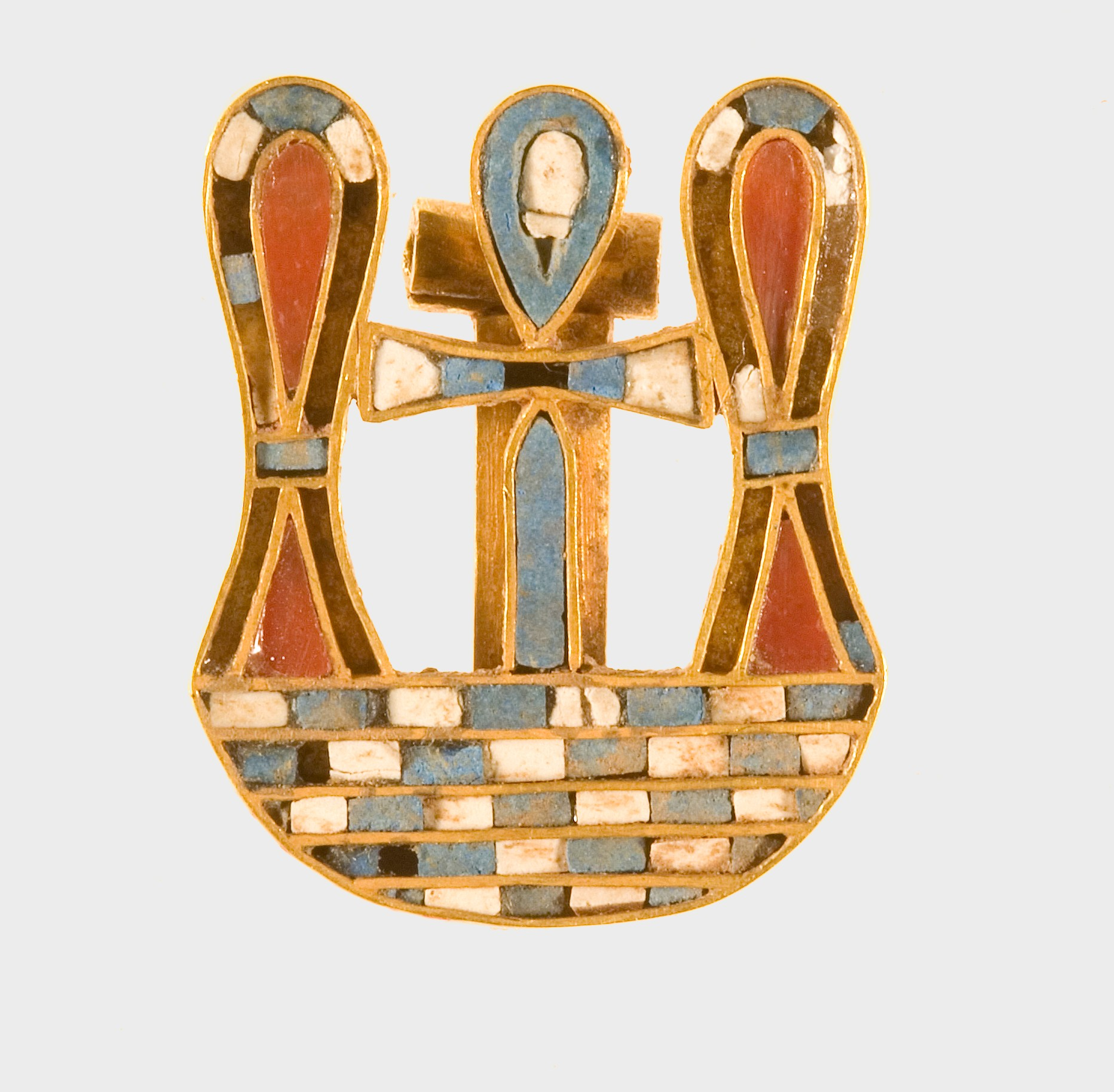
Ankh shaped clasp of Sithathoriunet

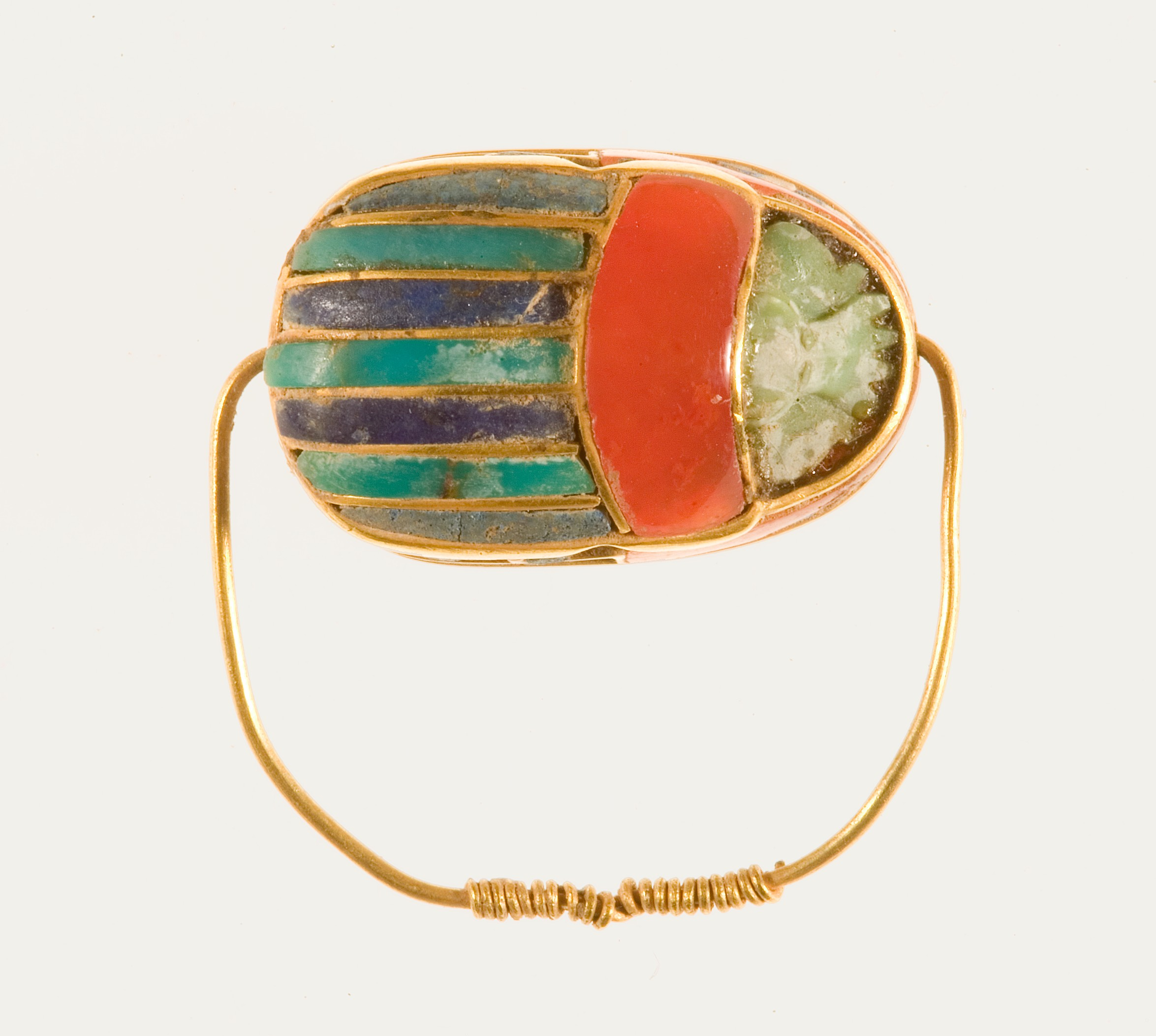
Ring of Sithathoriunet

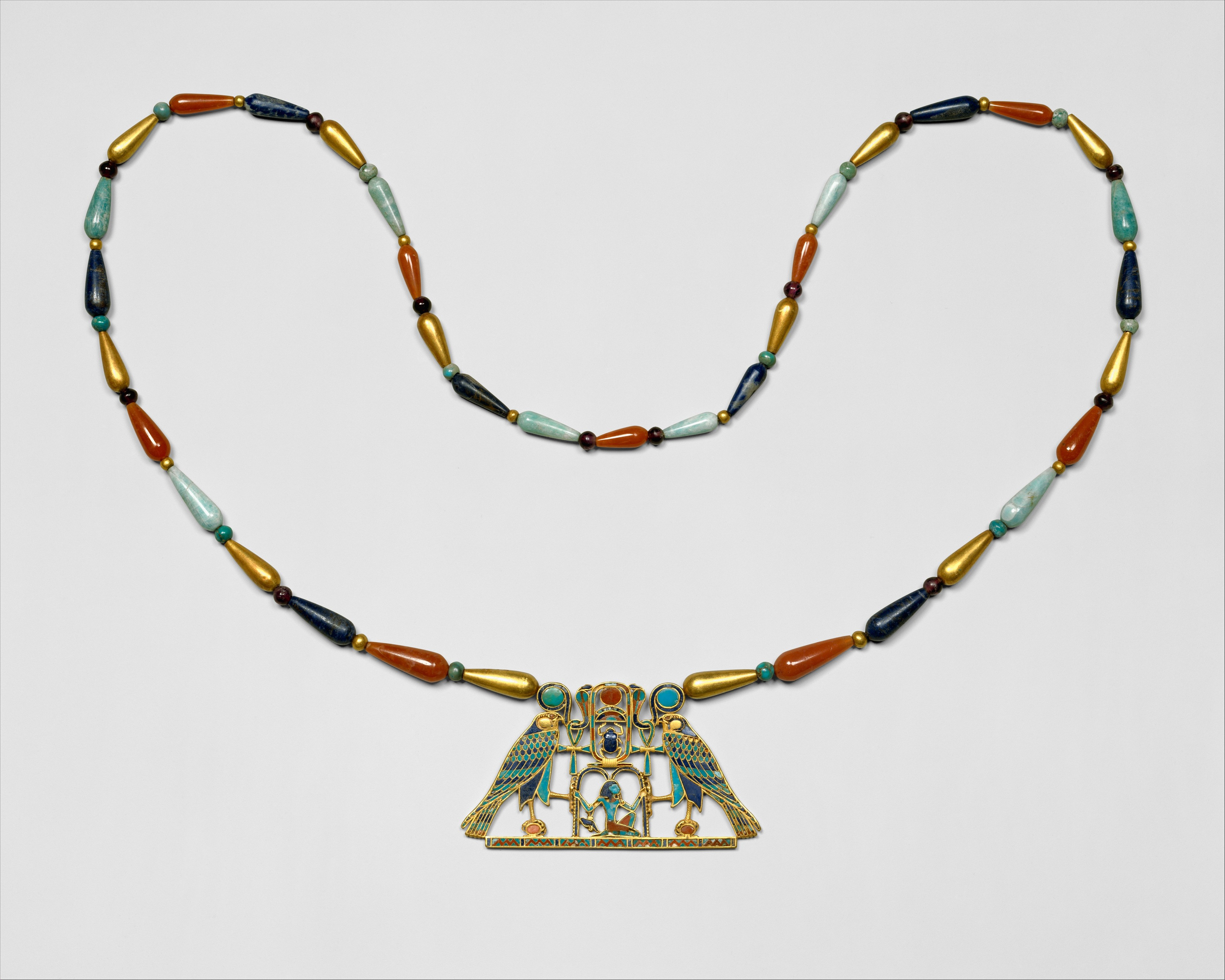
Pectoral and necklace of Princess Sithathoriunet; circa 1887–1813 BC; gold, carnelian, lapis lazuli, turquoise, garnet & feldspar; height of the pectoral: 4.5 cm (1 3/4 in.); The Met

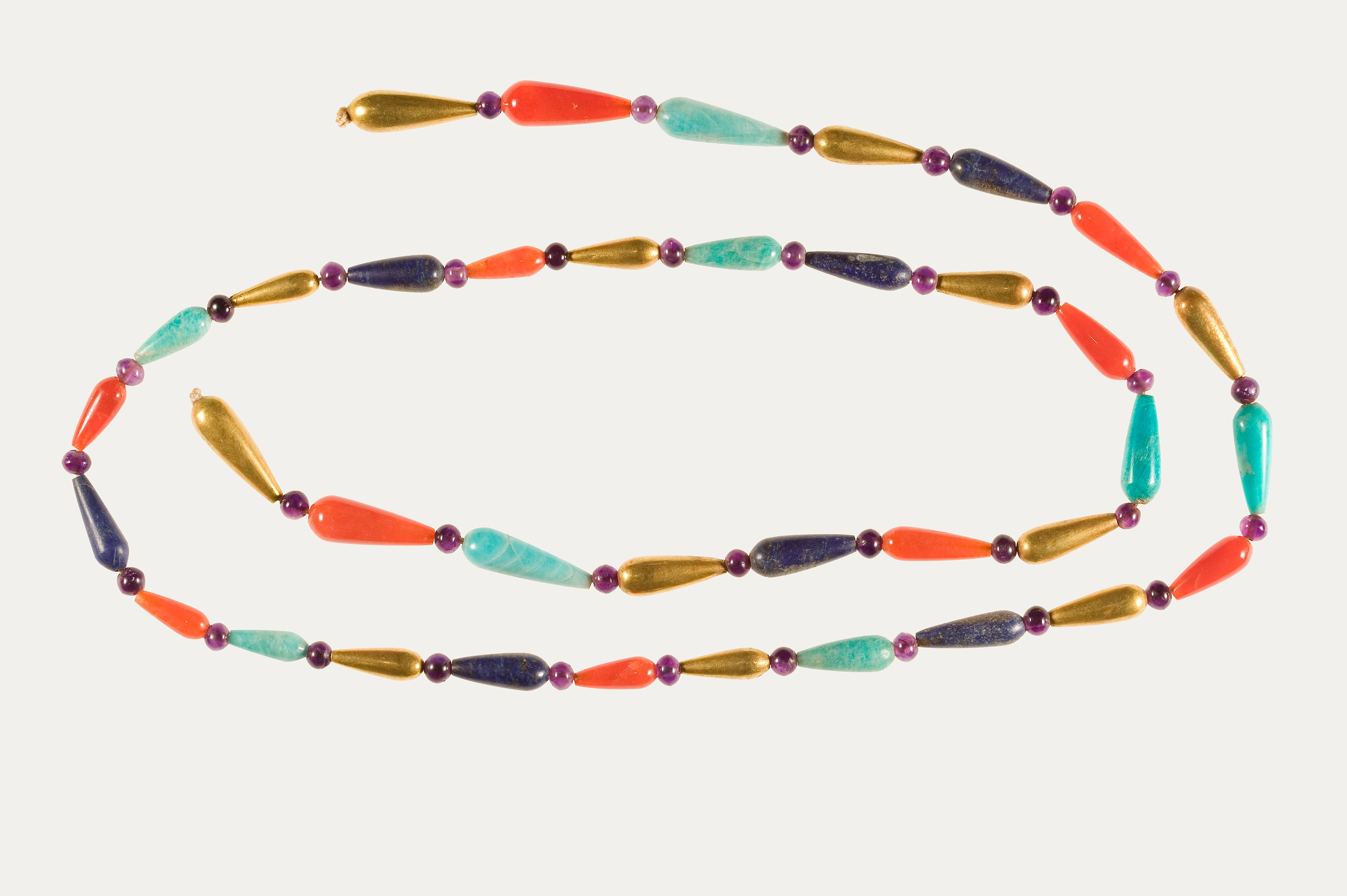
Necklace of Sithathoriunet

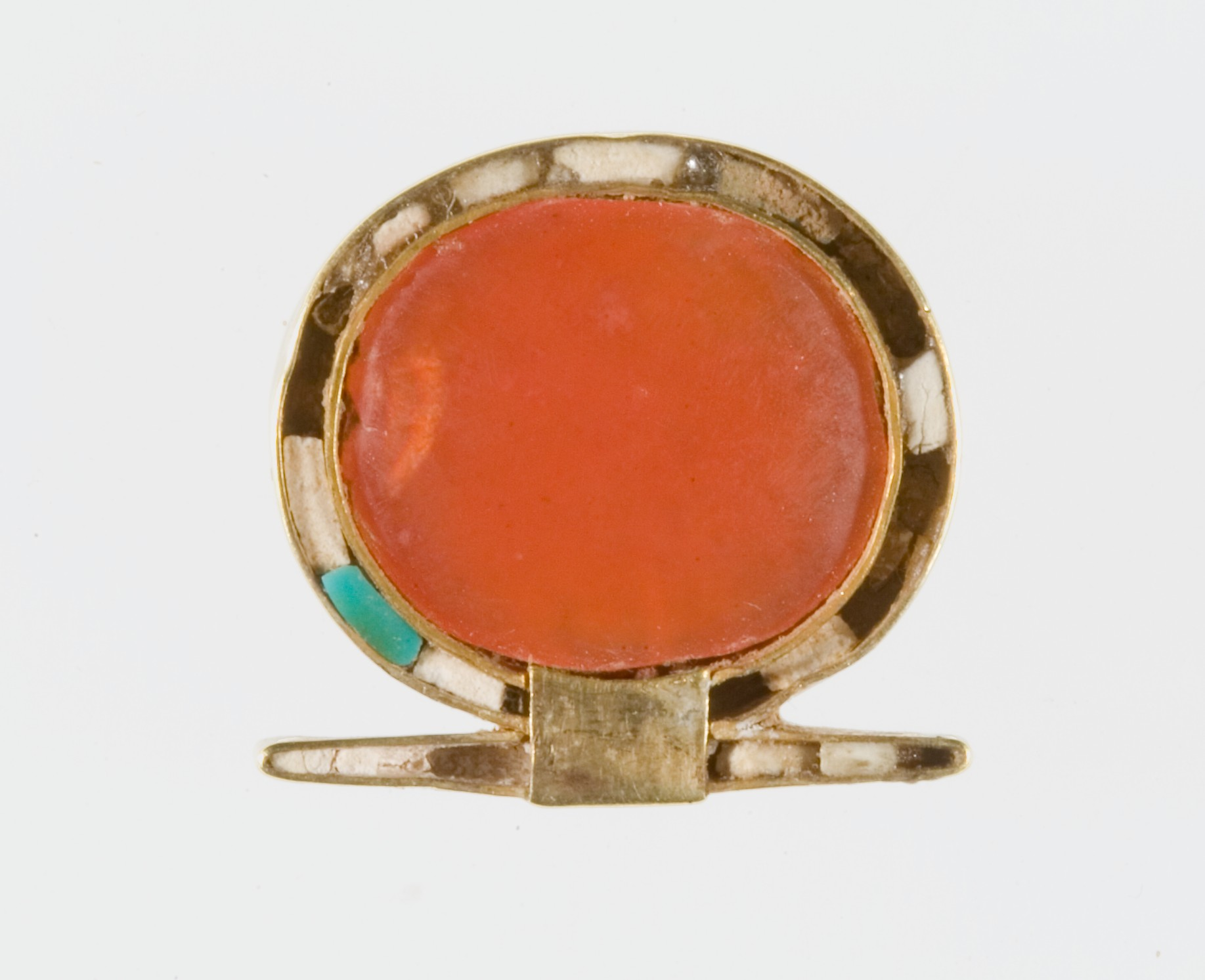
Motto clasp of Sithathoriunet

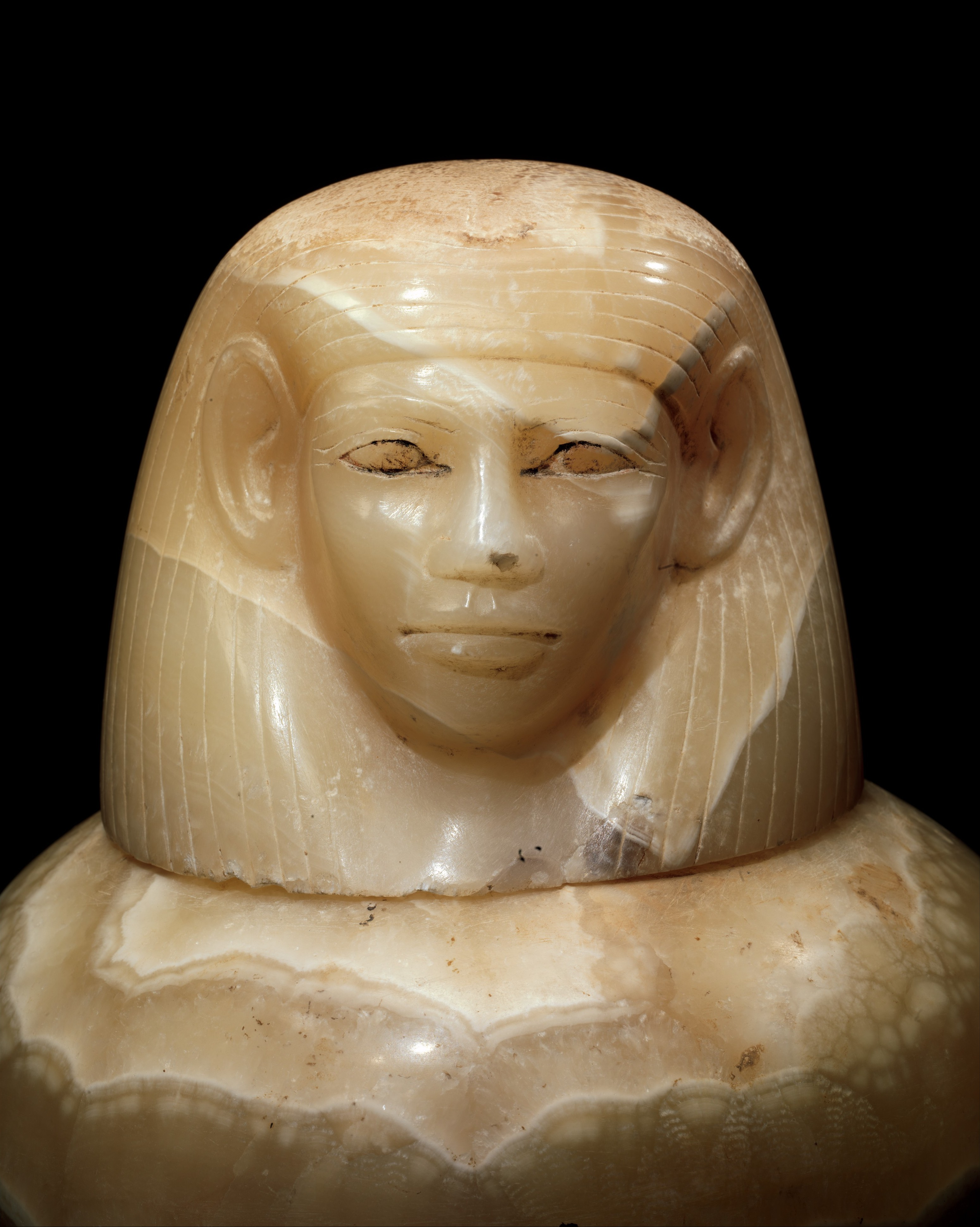
A canopic jar – that of Qebehsenuef – from Sithathoriunet's tomb

== Literature ==
- G. Brunton: Lahun I: The Treasure (BSAE 27 en ERA 20 (1914)), London 1920 the book online
- H. E. Winlock: The Treasure of el Lahun, New York 1973
