= Hand axe =

Stone tool

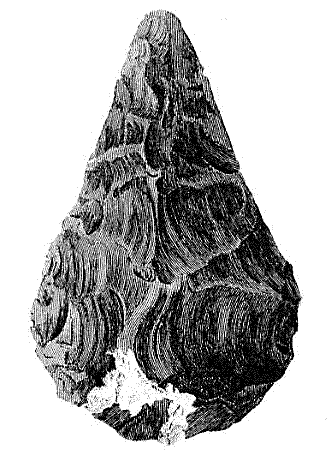
The first published picture of a hand axe, drawn by John Frere in the year 1800.

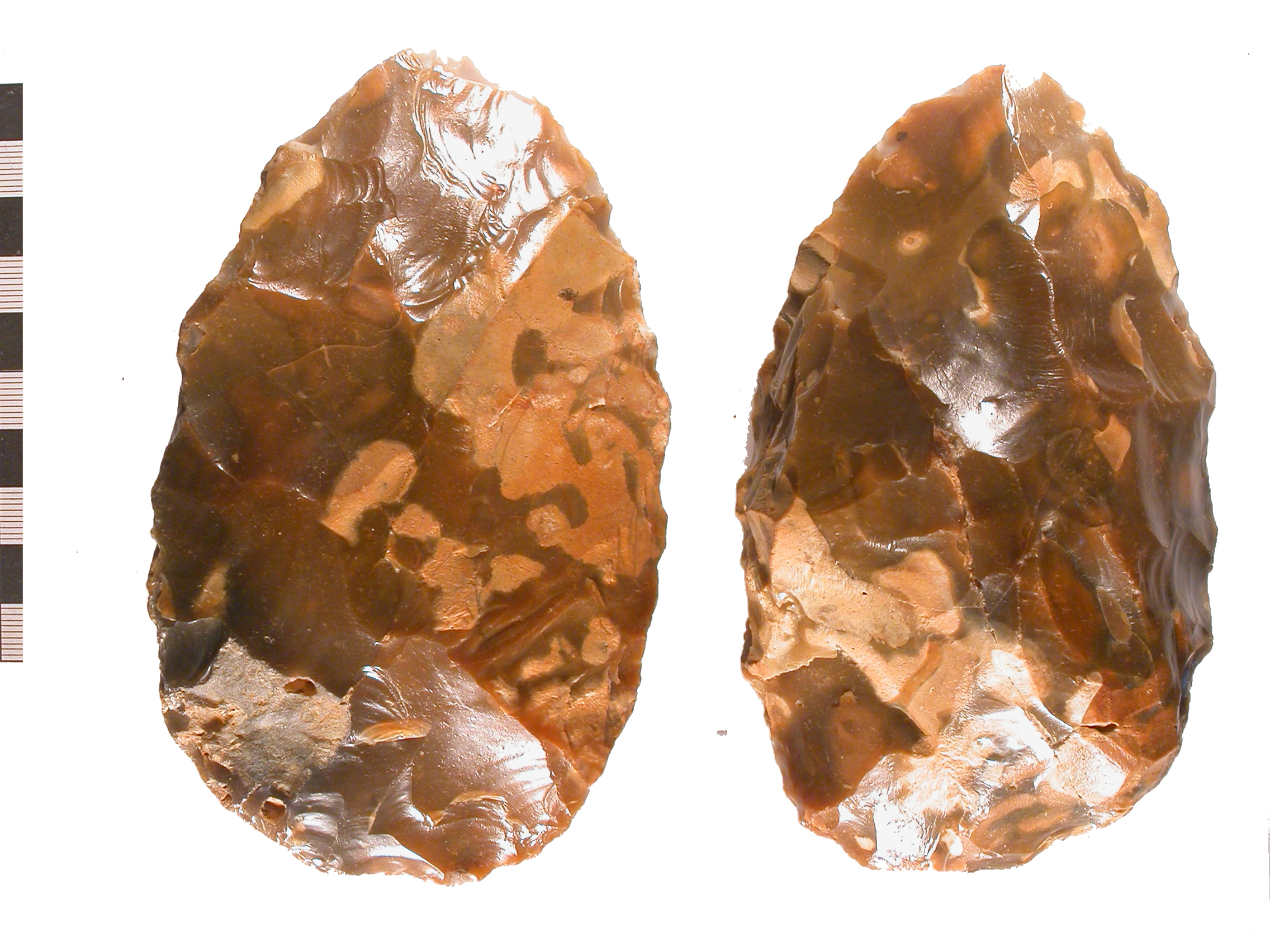
Flint hand axe found in Norfolk, England

A hand axe (or handaxe or Acheulean hand axe) is a prehistoric stone tool with two faces that is the longest-used tool in human history. It is made from stone, usually flint or chert that has been "reduced" and shaped from a larger piece by knapping, or hitting against another stone. They are characteristic of the lower Acheulean and middle Palaeolithic (Mousterian) periods, roughly 1.6 million years ago to about 100,000 years ago, and used by Homo erectus and other early humans, but rarely by Homo sapiens.

Their technical name (biface) comes from the fact that the archetypical model is a generally bifacial (with two wide sides or faces) and almond-shaped (amygdaloid) lithic flake. Hand axes tend to be symmetrical along their longitudinal axis and formed by pressure or percussion. The most common hand axes have a pointed end and rounded base, which gives them their characteristic almond shape, and both faces have been knapped to remove the natural cortex, at least partially. Hand axes are a type of the somewhat wider biface group of two-faced tools or weapons.

Hand axes were the first prehistoric tools to be recognized as such: the first published representation of a hand axe was drawn by John Frere and appeared in a British publication in 1800. Until that time, their origins were thought to be natural or supernatural. They were called thunderstones, because popular tradition held that they had fallen from the sky during storms or were formed inside the earth by a lightning strike and then appeared at the surface. They are used in some rural areas as an amulet to protect against storms.

Handaxes are generally thought to have been primarily used as cutting tools, particularly for tasks like animal butchery, with the wide base serving as an ergonomic area for the hand to grip the tool, though other secondary uses, such as throwing weapons and use as social and sexual signaling have been proposed.

== Terminology ==
The four classes of hand axe are:

1. Large, thick hand axes reduced from cores or thick flakes, referred to as blanks
2. Thinned blanks. While form remains rough and uncertain, an effort has been made to reduce the thickness of the flake or core
3. Either a preform or crude formalized tool, such as an adze
4. Finer formalized tool types such as projectile points and fine bifaces

While Class 4 hand axes are referred to as "formalized tools", bifaces from any stage of a lithic reduction sequence may be used as tools. (Other biface typologies make five divisions rather than four.)

French antiquarian André Vayson de Pradenne introduced the word biface in 1920. This term co-exists with the more popular hand axe (coup de poing), that was coined by Gabriel de Mortillet much earlier. The continued use of the word biface by François Bordes and Lionel Balout supported its use in France and Spain, where it replaced the term hand axe. Use of the expression hand axe has continued in English as the equivalent of the French biface (bifaz in Spanish), while biface applies more generally for any piece that has been carved on both sides by the removal of shallow or deep flakes. The expression Faustkeil is used in German; it can be literally translated as hand axe, although in a stricter sense it means "fist wedge". It is the same in Dutch where the expression used is vuistbijl which literally means "fist axe". The same locution occurs in other languages.

However, the general impression of these tools was based on ideal (or classic) pieces that were of such perfect shape that they caught the attention of non-experts. Their typology broadened the term's meaning. Biface hand axes and bifacial lithic items are distinguished. A hand axe need not be a bifacial item and many bifacial items are not hand axes. Nor were hand axes and bifacial items exclusive to the Lower Palaeolithic period in the Old World. They appear throughout the world and in many different pre-historical epochs, without necessarily implying an ancient origin. Lithic typology is not a reliable chronological reference and was abandoned as a dating system. Examples of this include the "quasi-bifaces" that sometimes appear in strata from the Gravettian, Solutrean and Magdalenian periods in France and Spain, the crude bifacial pieces of the Lupemban culture (9000 B.C.) or the pyriform tools found near Sagua La Grande in Cuba. The word biface refers to something different in English than biface in French or bifaz in Spanish, which could lead to many misunderstandings. Bifacially carved cutting tools, similar to hand axes, were used to clear scrub vegetation throughout the Neolithic and Chalcolithic periods. These tools are similar to more modern adzes and were a cheaper alternative to polished axes. The modern day villages along the Sepik river in New Guinea continue to use tools that are virtually identical to hand axes to clear forest. "The term biface should be reserved for items from before the Würm II-III interstadial", although certain later objects could exceptionally be called bifaces.

Hand axe does not relate to axe, which was overused in lithic typology to describe a wide variety of stone tools. At the time the use of such items was not understood. In the particular case of Palaeolithic hand axes the term axe is an inadequate description. Lionel Balout stated, "the term should be rejected as an erroneous interpretation of these objects that are not 'axes'". Subsequent studies supported this idea, particularly those examining the signs of use.

== Materials ==
Hand axes are mainly made of flint, but rhyolites, phonolites, quartzites and other coarse rocks were used as well. Obsidian, natural volcanic glass, shatters easily and was rarely used.

== Uses ==
Most researchers think that handaxes were primarily used as cutting tools. The pioneers of Palaeolithic tool studies first suggested that bifaces were used as axes despite the fact that they have a sharp border all around. Other uses seem to show that hand axes were a multi-functional tool, leading some to describe them as the "Acheulean Swiss Army knife". Other academics have suggested that the hand axe was simply a byproduct of being used as a core to make other tools, a weapon, or was perhaps used ritually.

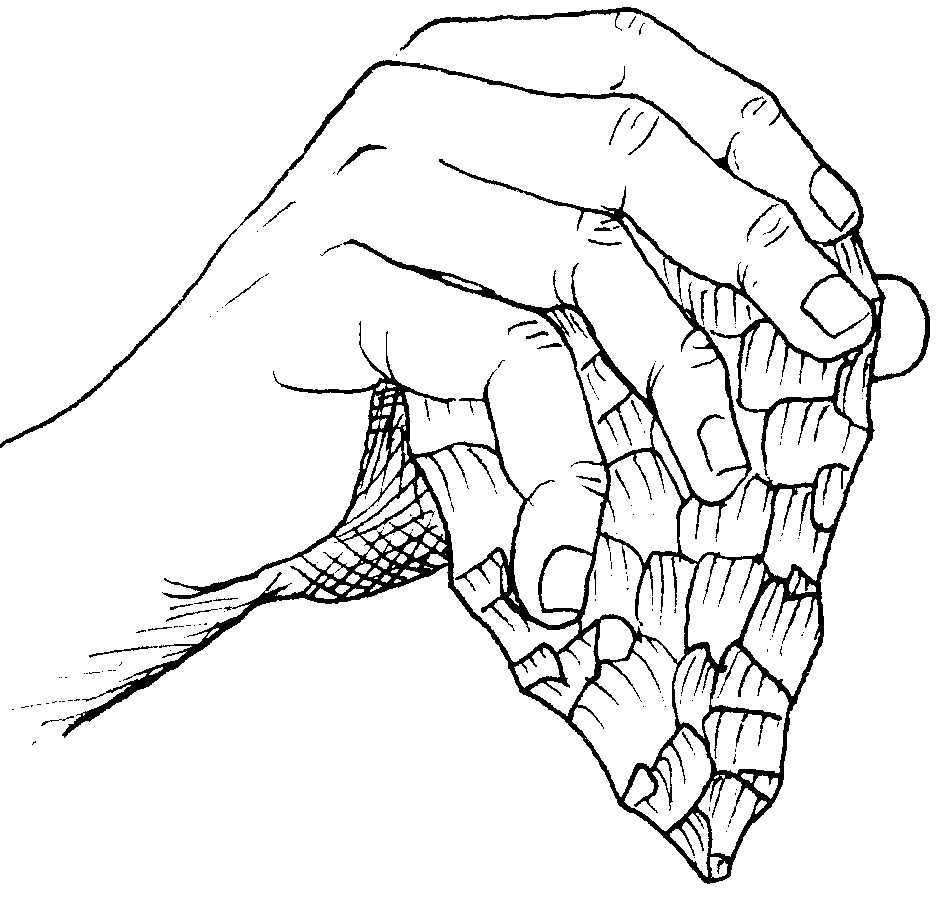
Drawing of how a biface aka hand axe may have been held

Wells proposed in 1899 that hand axes were used as missile weapons to hunt prey – an interpretation supported by Calvin, who suggested that some of the rounder specimens of Acheulean hand axes were used as hunting projectiles or as "killer frisbees" meant to be thrown at a herd of animals at a water hole so as to stun one of them. This assertion was inspired by findings from the Olorgesailie archaeological site in Kenya. Few specimens indicate hand axe hafting, and some are too large for that use. However, few hand axes show signs of heavy damage indicative of throwing, modern experiments have shown the technique to often result in flat-faced landings, and many modern scholars consider the "hurling" theory to be poorly conceived but so attractive that it has taken a life of its own.

As hand axes can be recycled, resharpened and remade, they could have been used for varied tasks. For this reason it may be misleading to think of them as axes; they could have been used for tasks such as digging, cutting, scraping, chopping, piercing, and hammering. However, other tools, such as small knives, are better suited for some of these tasks, and many hand axes have been found with no traces of use.

Baker suggested that since so many hand axes have been found that have no retouching, perhaps the hand axe was not itself a tool, but a large lithic core from which flakes had been removed and used as tools (flake core theory). On the other hand, there are many hand axes found with retouching such as sharpening or shaping, which casts doubt on this idea.

Other theories suggest the shape is part tradition and part by-product of its manufacture. Many early hand axes appear to be made from simple rounded pebbles (from river or beach deposits). It is necessary to detach a 'starting flake', often much larger than the rest of the flakes (due to the oblique angle of a rounded pebble requiring greater force to detach it), thus creating an asymmetry. Correcting the asymmetry by removing material from the other faces, encouraged a more pointed (oval) form factor. (Knapping a completely circular hand axe requires considerable correction of the shape.) Studies in the 1990s at Boxgrove, in which a butcher attempted to cut up a carcass with a hand axe, revealed that the hand axe was able to expose bone marrow.

Kohn and Mithen independently arrived at the explanation that symmetric hand axes were favoured by sexual selection as fitness indicators. Kohn in his book As We Know It wrote that the hand axe is "a highly visible indicator of fitness, and so becomes a criterion of mate choice." Miller followed their example and said that hand axes have characteristics that make them subject to sexual selection, such as that they were made for over a million years throughout Africa, Europe and Asia, they were made in large numbers, and most were impractical for utilitarian use. He claimed that a single design persisting across time and space cannot be explained by cultural imitation and draws a parallel between bowerbirds' bowers (built to attract potential mates and used only during courtship) and Pleistocene hominids' hand axes. He called hand axe building a "genetically inherited propensity to construct a certain type of object." He discards the idea that they were used as missile weapons because more efficient weapons were available, such as javelins. Although he accepted that some hand axes may have been used for practical purposes, he agreed with Kohn and Mithen who showed that many hand axes show considerable skill, design and symmetry beyond that needed for utility. Some were too big, such as the Maritime Academy handaxe or the "Great Hand Axe" found in Furze Platt, England that is 30.6 cm long (other scholars measure it as 39.5 cm long). Some were too small - less than two inches. Some were "overdetermined", featuring symmetry beyond practical requirements and showing evidence of unnecessary attention to form and finish. Some were actually made out of bone instead of stone and thus were not very practical, suggesting a cultural or ritual use. Miller thinks that the most important clue is that under electron microscopy hand axes show no signs of use or evidence of edge wear. Others argue that little evidence for use-wear simply relates to the particular sedimentological conditions, rather than being evidence of discarding without use. It has been noted that hand axes can be good handicaps in Zahavi's handicap principle theory: learning costs are high, risks of injury, they require physical strength, hand-eye coordination, planning, patience, pain tolerance and resistance to infection from cuts and bruises when making or using such a hand axe.

=== Evidence from wear analysis ===
The use-wear analysis of Palaeolithic hand axes is carried out on findings from emblematic sites across nearly all of Western Europe. Keeley and Semenov were the pioneers of this specialized investigation. Keeley stated, "The morphology of typical hand axes suggests a greater range of potential activities than those of flakes".

Many problems need to be overcome in carrying out this type of analysis. One is the difficulty in observing larger pieces with a microscope. Of the millions of known pieces and despite their long role in human history, few have been thoroughly studied. Another arises from the clear evidence that the same tasks were performed more effectively using utensils made from flakes:

This raises the question: why make hand axes, whose production is more complicated and costly, if the flakes can do the same work with the same efficiency? The answer could be that, in general, hand axes were not conceived for a particular function (excluding certain specialized types) [...], they were not made for one main task but covered a much more general purpose.

— Keeley

Keeley based his observations on archaeological sites in England. He proposed that in base settlements where it was possible to predict future actions and where greater control on routine activities was common, the preferred tools were made from specialized flakes, such as racloirs, backed knives, scrapers and punches. However, hand axes were more suitable on expeditions and in seasonal camps, where unforeseen tasks were more common. Their main advantage in these situations was the lack of specialization and adaptability to multiple eventualities. A hand axe has a long blade with different curves and angles, some sharper and others more resistant, including points and notches. All of this is combined in one tool. Given the right circumstances, it is possible to make use of loose flakes. In the same book, Keeley states that a number of the hand axes studied were used as knives to cut meat (such as hand axes from Hoxne and Caddington). He identified that the point of another hand axe had been used as a clockwise drill. This hand axe came from Clacton-on-Sea (all of these sites are located in the east of England). Toth reached similar conclusions for pieces from the Spanish site in Ambrona (Soria). Analysis carried out by Domínguez-Rodrigo and co-workers on the primitive Acheulean site in Peninj (Tanzania) on a series of tools dated 1.5 mya shows clear microwear produced by plant phytoliths, suggesting that the hand axes were used to work wood. Among other uses, use-wear evidence for fire making has been identified on dozens of later Middle Palaeolithic hand axes from France, suggesting Neanderthals struck these tools with the mineral pyrite to produce sparks at least 50,000 years ago.

A wear analysis of handaxes from the 480,000 year old late Acheulean Boxgrove site in England found that they were primarily if not exclusively used for animal butchery, with no evidence for their use in woodworking or digging.

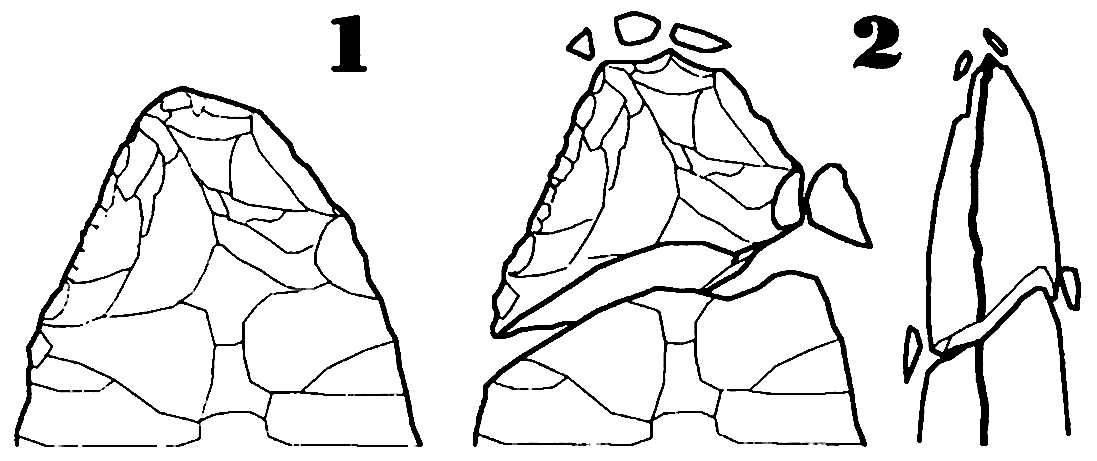
Drawing of the fracturing of the point of a hand axe, due to its use.

==== Macroscopic traces ====
Some hand axes were used with force that left clearly visible marks. Other visible marks can be left as the scars from retouching, on occasion it is possible to distinguish them from marks left by the initial manufacture. One of the most common cases is when a point breaks. This was seen at sites in Europe, Africa and Asia. One example comes from the El Basalito site in Salamanca, where excavation uncovered fragments of a hand axe with marks at the tip that appeared to be the result of the action of a wedge, which would have subjected the object to high levels of torsion that broke the tip. A break or extreme wear can affect a tool's point or any other part. Such wear was reworked by means of a secondary working as discussed above. In some cases this reconstruction is easily identifiable and was carried out using techniques such as the coup de tranchet (French, meaning "tranchet blow"), or simply with scale or scalariform retouches that alter an edge's symmetry and line.

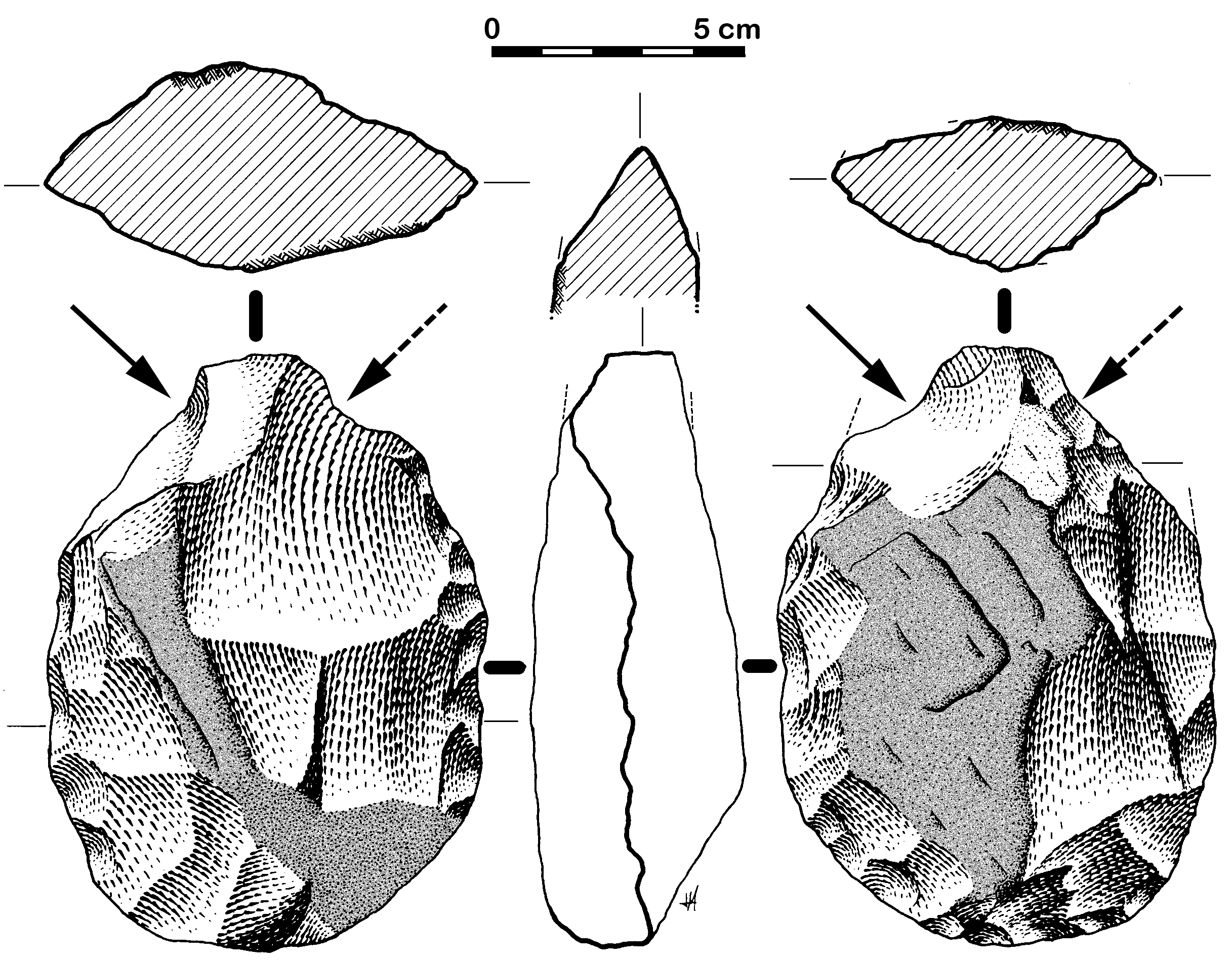
Acheulean hand axe whose point fractured and was reconstructed using a different working

== Forms ==
With its flattened-teardrop symmetry, the Achulean handaxe has long invited cognitive explanations. It is the earliest hominid tool that seems "designed" in some modern sense. Yet, for most of the "Swiss Army knife" multipurpose suite of proposed uses (defleshing, scraping, pounding roots, and flake source), an easy-to-make shape would suffice – and indeed the simpler tools continued to be made. None of these uses adequately addresses the "design aspects". Why is the handaxe mostly symmetric, why mostly flattened, why the seldom-sharp point, why sharpened all around (when that interferes with gripping the tool for pounding uses)? Neither does a suite of uses suggest why this form could remain the same from southern Africa to northern Europe to eastern Asia – and resist cultural drift for so long. The handaxe technique and its rationale were surely lost many times, just as Tasmanians lost fishing and fire-starting practices. So how did Homo erectus keep rediscovering the enigmatic handaxe shape, over and over for nearly 1.5 million years?

— William H Calvin

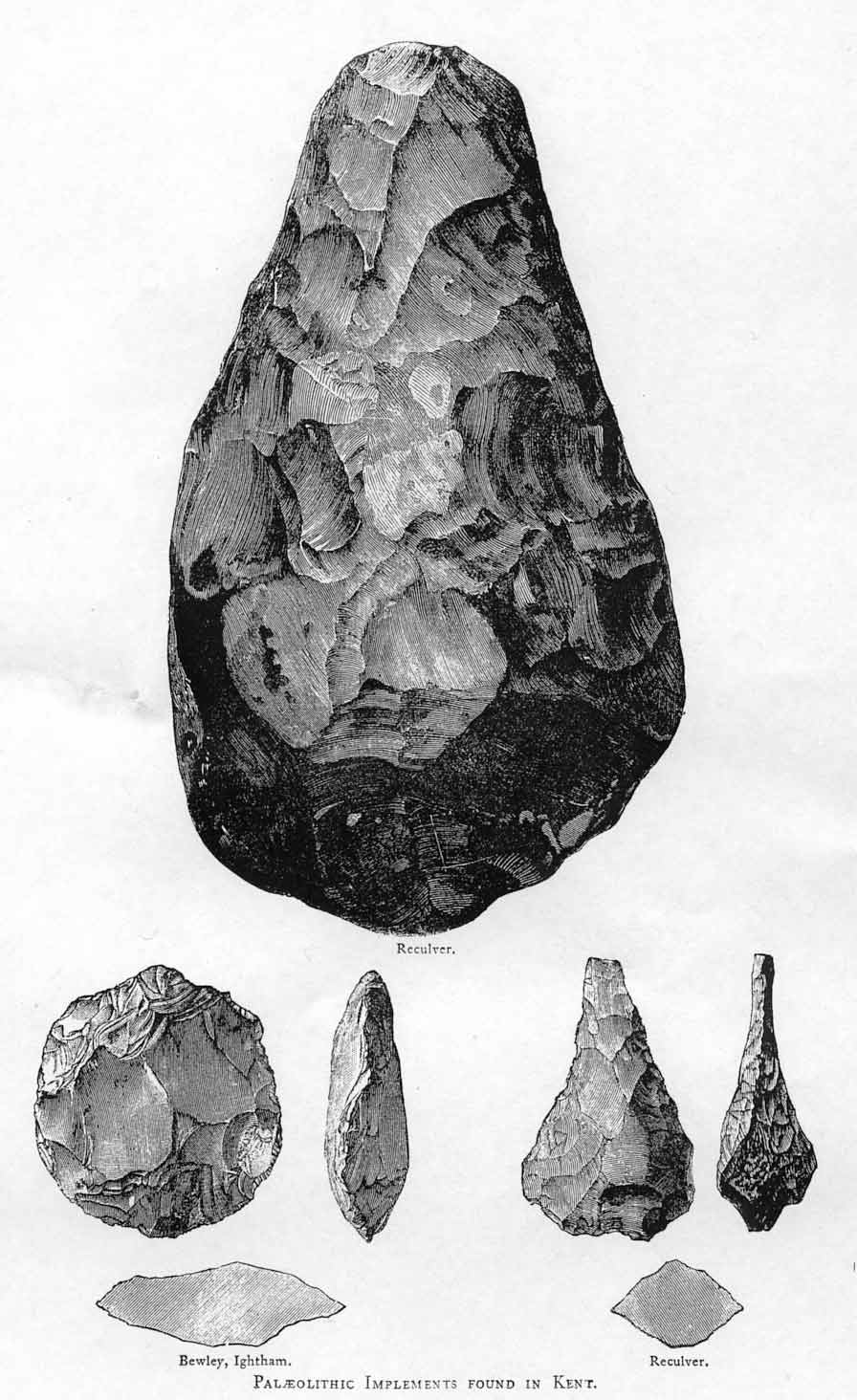
Acheulean hand axes from Kent. The types shown are (clockwise from top) chordate, ficron and ovate.

The most characteristic and common shape is a pointed area at one end, cutting edges along its side and a rounded base (this includes hand axes with a lanceolate and amygdaloidal shape as well as others from the family). The axes are almost always symmetrical despite studies showing that hand axe symmetry does not help in tasks such as skinning animals. While there is a "typical" shape to most hand axes, there are some displaying a variety of shapes, including circular, triangular and elliptical—calling in to question the contention that they had a constant and only symbolic significance. They are typically between 8 and 15 cm (3 and 6 in) long, although they can be bigger or smaller.

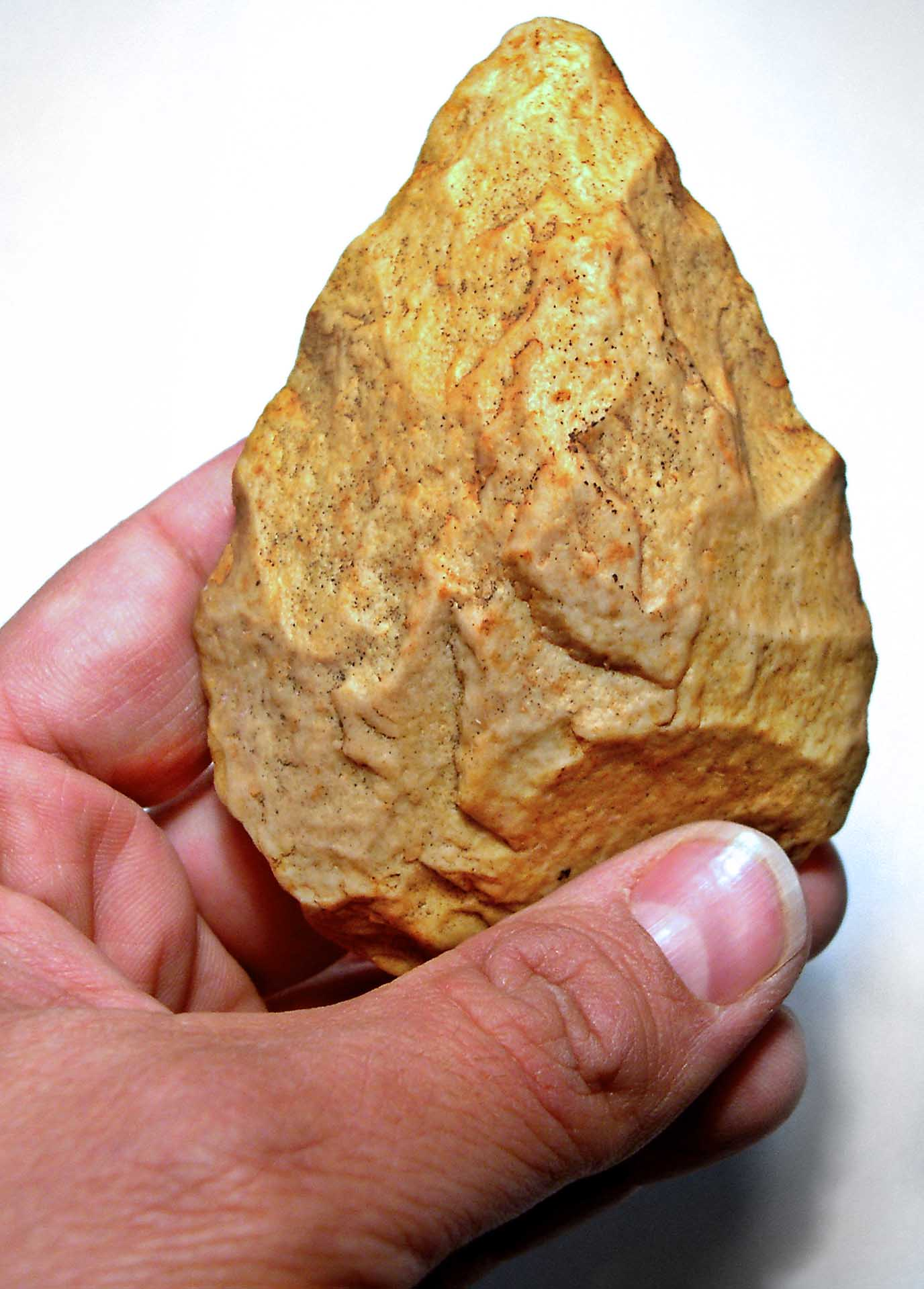
Typical Acheulean hand axe

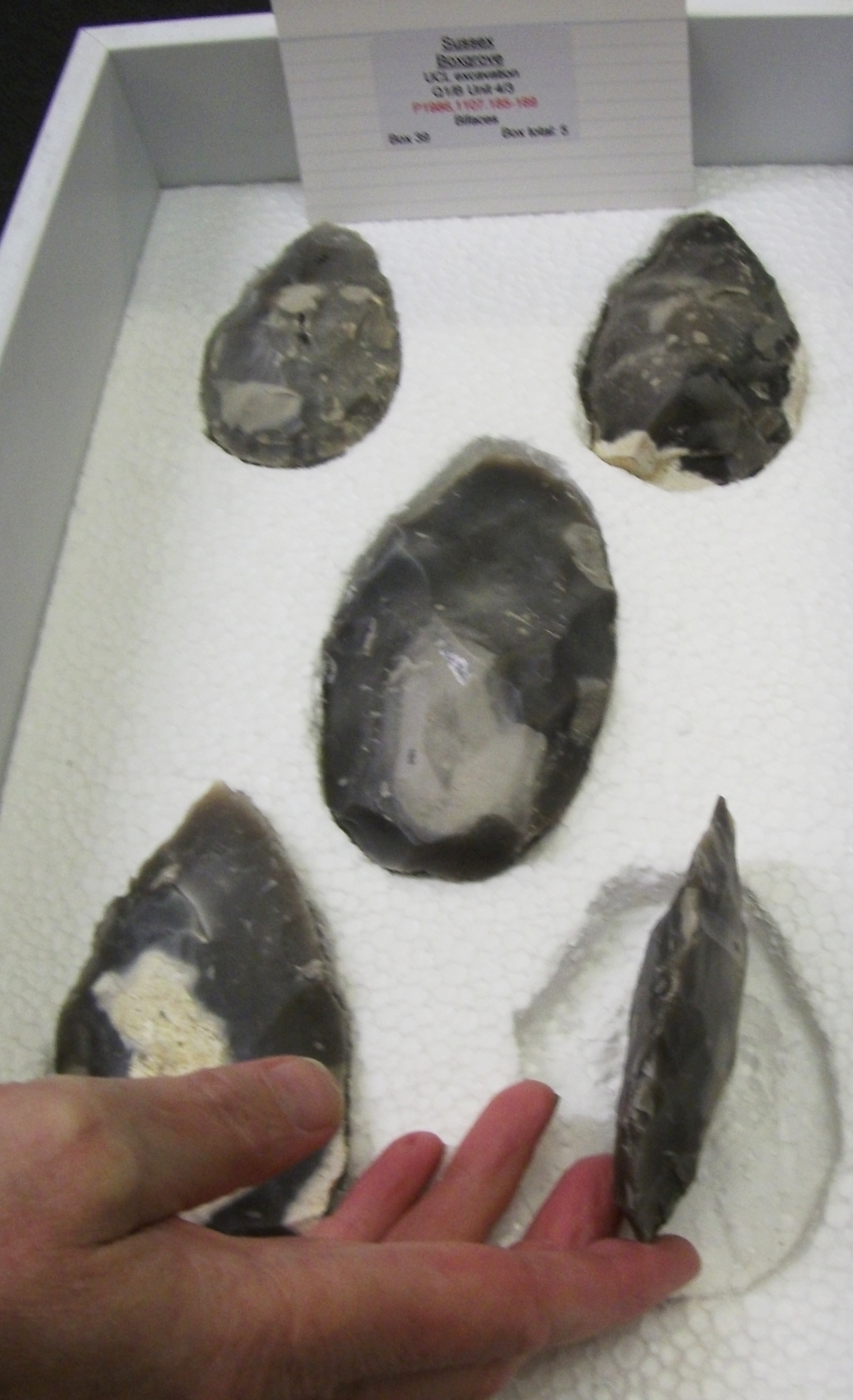
Examples of ovate handaxes from the Boxgrove site in England

They were typically made from a rounded stone, a block or lithic flake, using a hammer to remove flakes from both sides of the item. This hammer can be made of hard stone, or of wood or antler. The latter two, softer hammers can produce more delicate results. However, a hand axe's technological aspect can reflect more differences. For example, uniface tools have only been worked on one side and partial bifaces retain a high proportion of the natural cortex of the tool stone, often making them easy to confuse with chopping tools. Further, simple bifaces may have been created from a suitable tool stone, but they rarely show evidence of retouching. Later hand axes were improved by the use of the Levallois technique to make the more sophisticated and lighter Levallois core.

In summary, hand axes are recognized by many typological schools under different archaeological paradigms and are quite recognisable (at least the most typical examples). However, they have not been definitively categorized. Stated more formally, the idealised model combines a series of well-defined properties, but no set of these properties are necessary or sufficient to identify a hand axe.

The study of hand axes is made complicated because its shape is the result of a complicated chain of technical actions that are only occasionally revealed in their later stages. If this complexity of intentions during the manufacture of a hand axe is added to its variety of forms [...] we realise that the hand axe is one of the most problematical and complex objects in Prehistory

— Benito del Rey.

== History and distribution ==
In 1969 in the 2nd edition of World Prehistory, Grahame Clark proposed an evolutionary progression of flint-knapping industries (also known as complexes or technocomplexes) in which the "dominant lithic technologies" occurred in a fixed sequence where simple Oldowan one-edged tools were replaced by these more complex Acheulean hand axes, which were then eventually replaced by the even more complex Mousterian tools made with the Levallois technique.

The oldest known Oldowan tools were found in Gona, Ethiopia. These are dated to about 2.6 mya.

Early examples of hand axes date back to 1.6 mya in the later Oldowan (Mode I), called the "developed Oldowan" by Mary Leakey. These hand axes became more abundant in mode II Acheulean industries that appeared in Southern Ethiopia around 1.4 mya. Some of the best specimens come from 1.2 mya deposits in Olduvai Gorge.

By 1.8 mya early man was present in Europe. Remains of their activities were excavated in Spain at sites in the Guadix-Baza basin and near Atapuerca. Most early European sites yield "mode 1" or Oldowan assemblages. The earliest Acheulean sites in Europe appear around 0.5 mya. In addition, the Acheulean tradition did not spread to Eastern Asia. In Europe and particularly in France and England, the oldest hand axes appear after the Beestonian Glaciation–Mindel Glaciation, approximately 750,000 years ago, during the so-called Cromerian complex. They became more widely produced during the Abbevillian tradition.

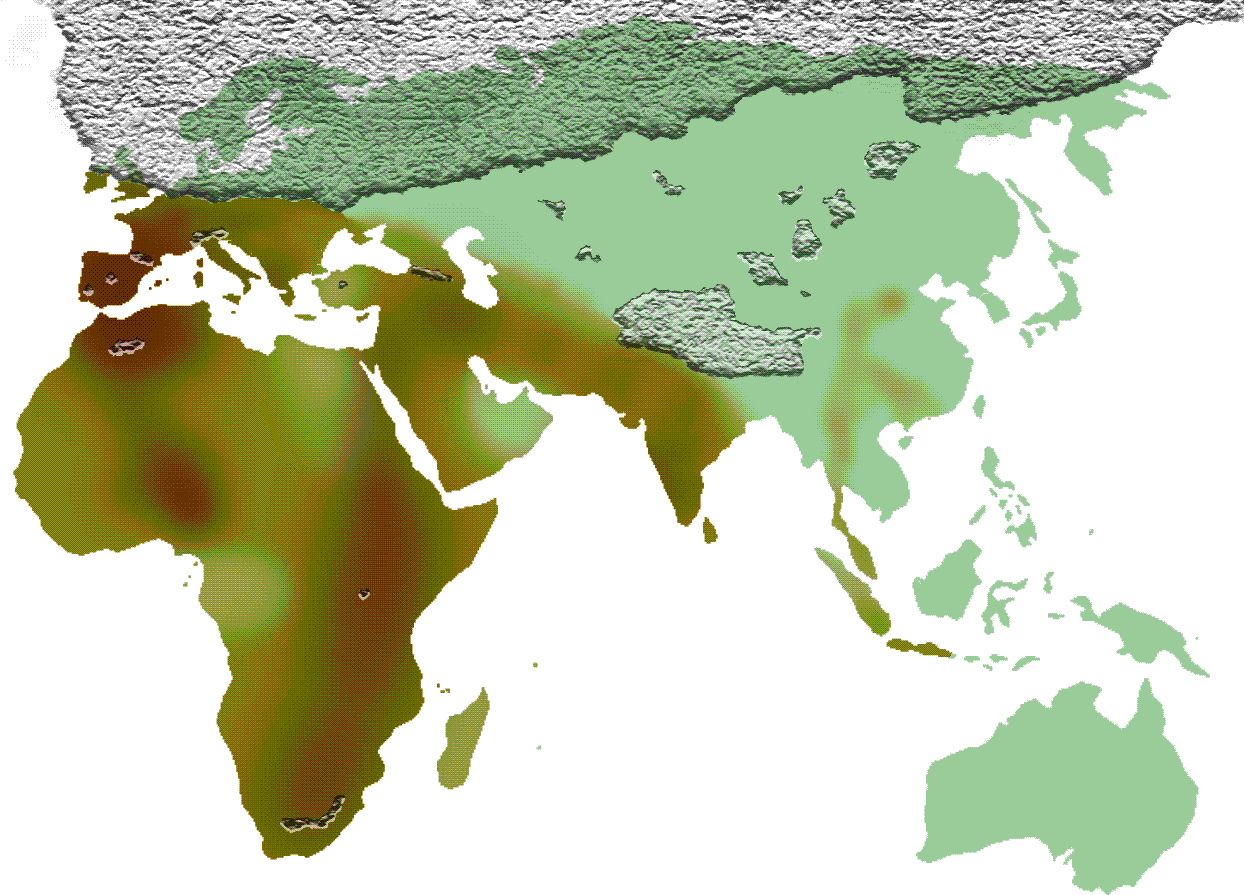
Map showing the approximate distribution of cultures using bifaces during the Middle Pleistocene (Acheulean) Areas with bifaces Areas without bifaces

The apogee of hand axe manufacture took place in a wide area of the Old World, especially during the Riss glaciation, in a cultural complex that can be described as cosmopolitan and which is known as the Acheulean. The use of hand axes survived the Middle Palaeolithic in a much smaller area and were especially important during the Mousterian, up to the middle of the Last glacial period.

[In Europe s]mall bifaces are found from the late Acheulean until the Aurignacian

— Pierre-Jean Texier, Préhistoire et Technologie lithique, page 18

Hand axes dating from the lower Palaeolithic were found on the Asian continent, on the Indian subcontinent and in the Middle East (to the south of parallel 40° N), but they were absent from the area to the east of the 90° E meridian. Movius designated a border (the so-called Movius Line) between the cultures that used hand axes to the west and those that made chopping tools and small retouched lithic flakes, such as were made by Peking Man and the Ordos culture in China, or their equivalents in Indochina such as the Hoabinhian. However, Movius' hypothesis was proved incorrect when many hand axes made in Palaeolithic era were found in 1978 at Hantan River, Jeongok, Yeoncheon County, South Korea for the first time in East Asia. Some of them are exhibited at the Jeongok Prehistory Museum, South Korea.

The Padjitanian culture from Java was traditionally thought to be the only oriental culture to manufacture hand axes. However, a site in Baise, Guangxi, China shows that hand axes were made in eastern Asia.

Hand axe technology is almost unknown in Australian prehistory, although a few have been found.

== Construction ==
Experiments in knapping have demonstrated the relative ease with which a hand axe can be made, which could help explain their success. In addition, they demand relatively little maintenance and allow a choice of raw materials–any rock will suffice that supports a conchoidal fracture. With early hand axes, it is easy to improvise their manufacture, correct mistakes without requiring detailed planning, and no long or demanding apprenticeship is necessary to learn the necessary techniques. These factors combine to allow these objects to remain in use throughout pre-history. Their adaptability makes them effective in a variety of tasks, from heavy duty such as digging in soil, felling trees or breaking bones to delicate such as cutting ligaments, slicing meat or perforating a variety of materials.

Later examples of hand axes are more sophisticated with their use of two layers of knapping (one made with stone knapping and one made with bone knapping).

Lastly, a hand axe represents a prototype that can be refined giving rise to more developed, specialised and sophisticated tools such as the tips of various projectiles, knives, adzes and hatchets.

== Analysis ==
Given the typological difficulties in defining the essence of a hand axe, it is important when analysing them to take account of their archaeological context (geographical location, stratigraphy, the presence of other elements associated with the same level, chronology etc.). It is necessary to study their physical state to establish any natural alterations that may have occurred: patina, shine, wear and tear, mechanical, thermal and / or physical-chemical changes such as cracking, in order to distinguish these factors from the scars left during the tool's manufacture or use.

The raw material is an important factor, because of the result that can be obtained by working it and in order to reveal the economy and movement of prehistoric humans. In the Olduvai Gorge the raw materials were most readily available some ten kilometres from the nearest settlements. However, flint or silicate is readily available on the fluvial terraces of Western Europe. This means that different strategies were required for the procurement and use of available resources. The supply of materials was the most important factor in the manufacturing process as Palaeolithic artisans were able to adapt their methods to available materials, obtaining adequate results from even the most difficult raw materials. Despite this it is important to study the rock's grain, texture, the presence of joints, veins, impurities or shatter cones etc.

In order to study the use of individual items it is necessary to look for traces of wear such as pseudo-retouches, breakage or wear, including areas that are polished. If the item is in a good condition it is possible to submit it to use-wear analysis, which is discussed in more detail below. Apart from these generalities, which are common to all carved archaeological pieces, hand axes need a technical analysis of their manufacture and a morphological analysis.

=== Technical analysis ===
The technical analysis of a hand axe tries to discover each of the phases in its chaîne opératoire (operational sequence). The chain is highly flexible, as a toolmaker may focus narrowly on just one of the sequence's links or equally on each link. The links examined in this type of study start with the extraction methods of the raw material, then include the actual manufacture of the item, its use, maintenance throughout its working life, and finally its disposal.

A toolmaker may put a lot of effort into finding the highest quality raw material or the most suitable tool stone. In this way more effort is invested in obtaining a good foundation, but time is saved on shaping the stone: that is, the effort is focused on the start of the operational chain. Equally the artisan may concentrate the most effort in the manufacture so that the quality or suitability of the raw material is less important. This will minimize the initial effort, but will result in a greater effort at the end of the operational chain.

==== Tool stone and cortex ====
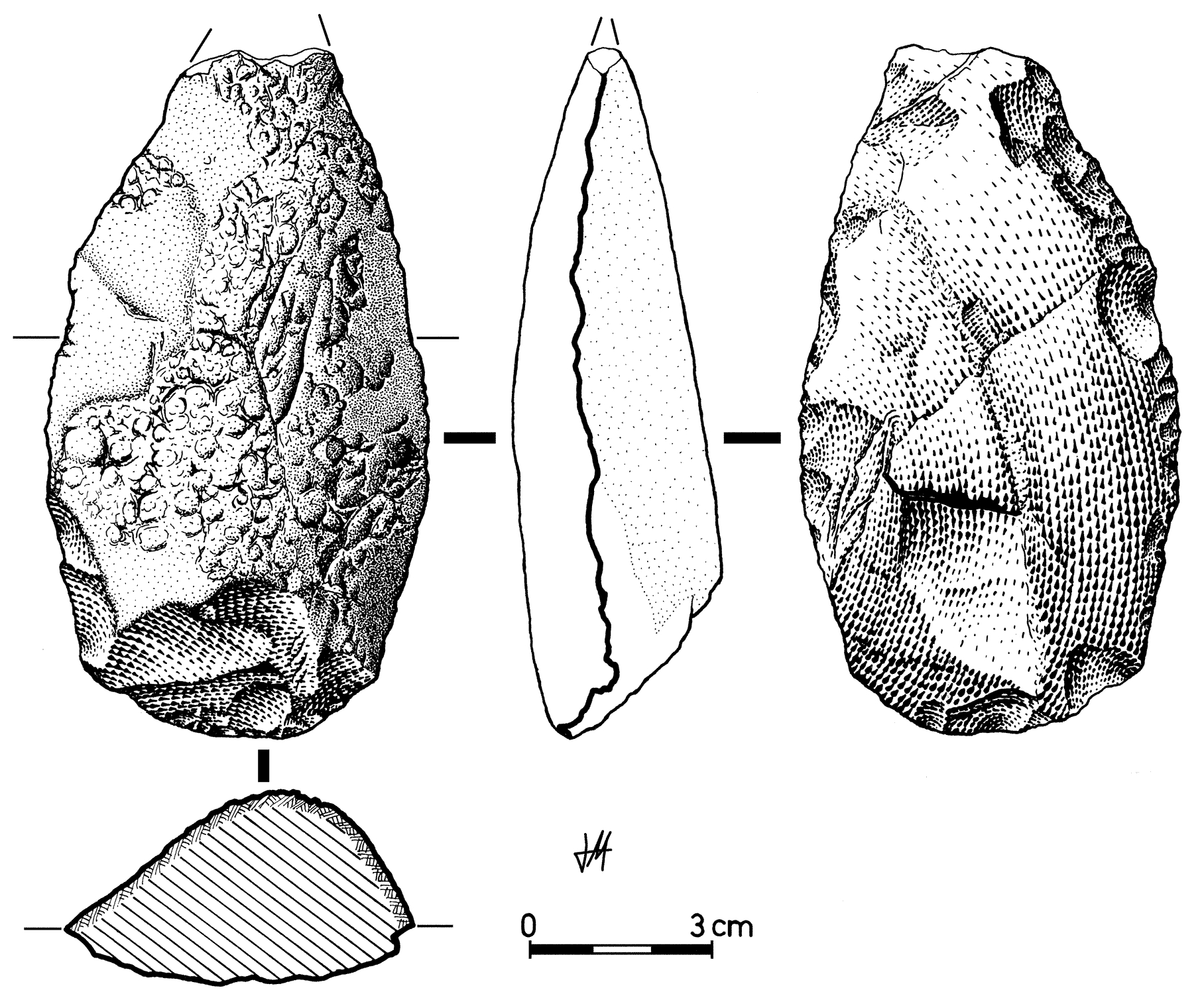
Simple Acheulean hand axe made from a large quartzite flake (direction of knapping: lateral)

Hand axes are most commonly made from rounded pebbles or nodules, but many are also made from a large flake. Hand axes made from flakes first appeared at the start of the Acheulean period and became more common with time. Manufacturing a hand axe from a flake is actually easier than from a pebble. It is also quicker, as flakes are more likely to be closer to the desired shape. This allows easier manipulation and fewer knaps are required to finish the tool; it is also easier to obtain straight edges. When analysing a hand axe made from a flake, it should be remembered that its shape was predetermined (by use of the Levallois technique or Kombewa technique or similar).

The natural external cortex or rind of the tool stone, which is due to erosion and the physical-chemical alterations of weathering, is different from the stone's interior. In the case of chert, quartz or quartzite, this alteration is basically mechanical, and apart from the colour and the wear it has the same characteristics as the interior in terms of hardness, toughness etc. However, flint is surrounded by a limestone cortex that is soft and unsuitable for stone tools. As hand axes are made from a tool stone's core, it is normal to indicate the thickness and position of the cortex in order to better understand the techniques that are required in their manufacture. The variation in cortex between utensils should not be taken as an indication of their age.

Many partially-worked hand axes do not require further work in order to be effective tools. They can be considered to be simple hand axes. Less suitable tool stone requires more thorough working. In some specimens the cortex is unrecognisable due to the complete working that it has undergone, which has eliminated any vestige of the original cortex.

== Types ==
It is possible to distinguish multiple types of hand axe:

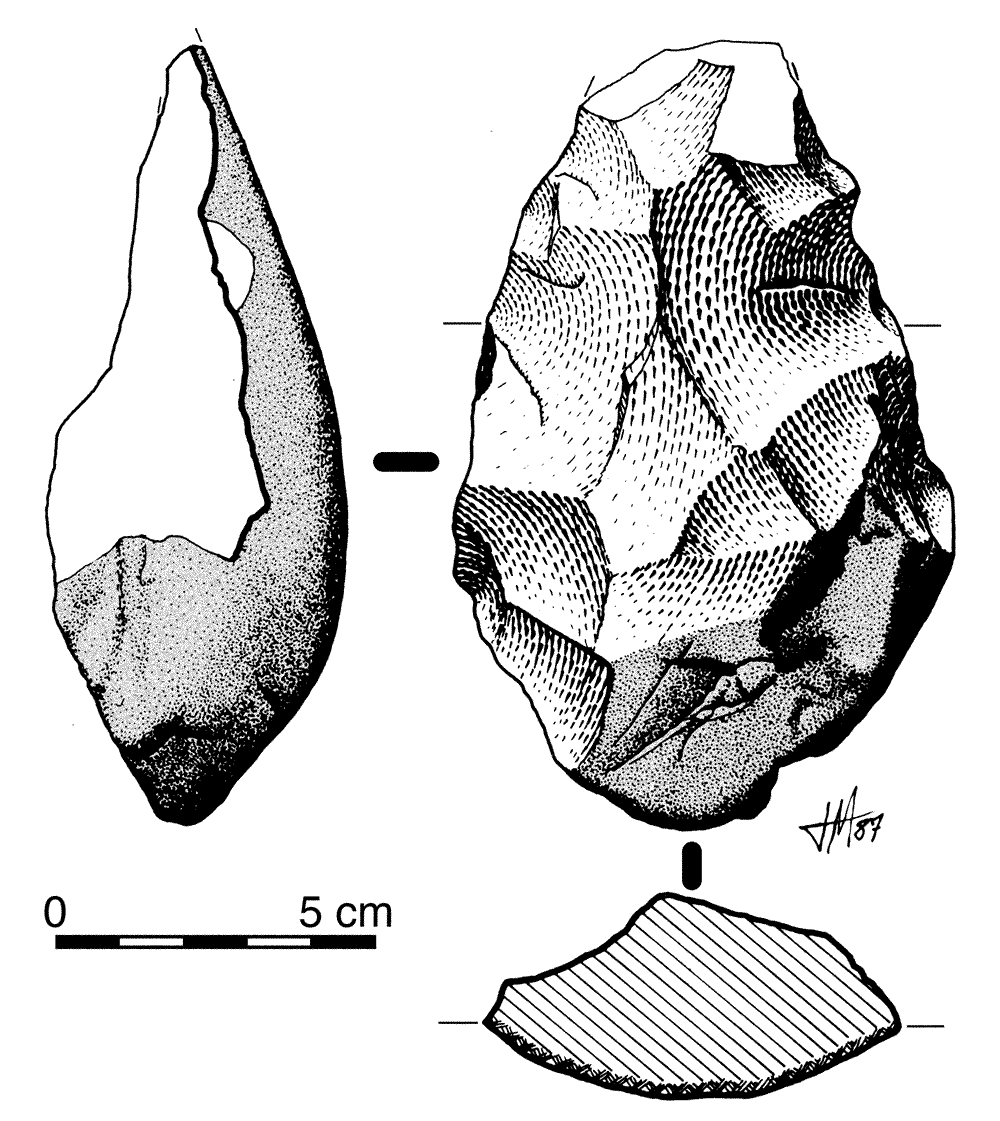
Uniface hand axe.

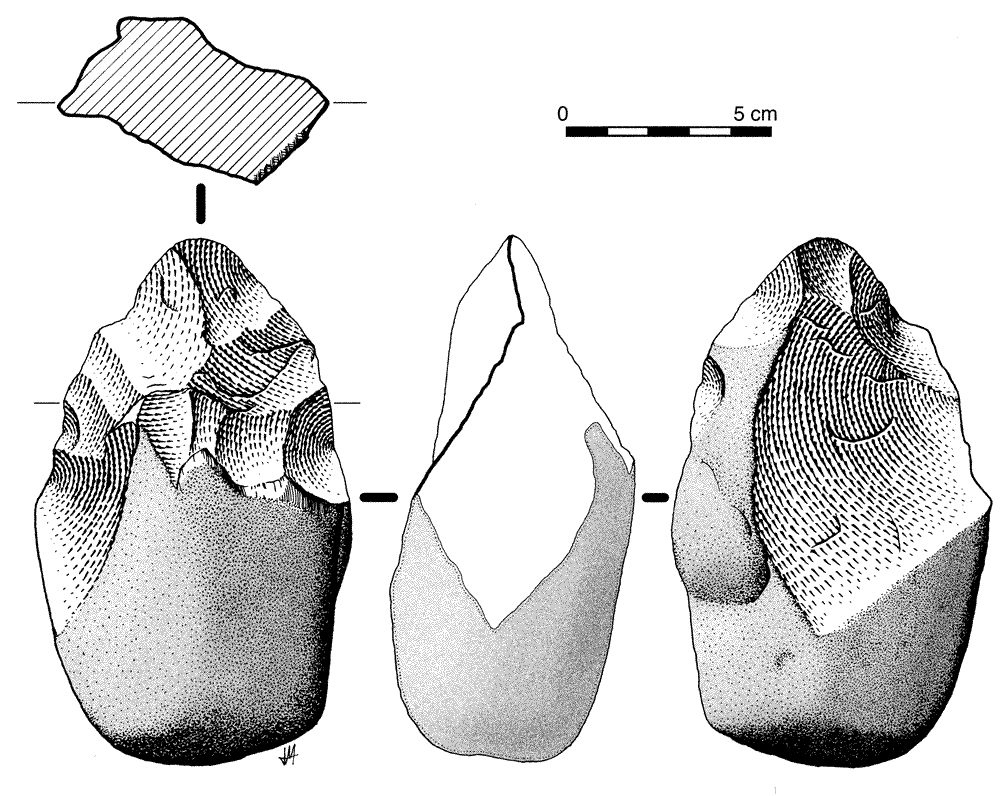
Partial biface.

- Uniface—flaked on one face with cortex completely covering the other side. This characteristic does not disqualify such tools as hand axes and gives no indication of their age.
- Partial biface—The cortex is present on the tool's base and central part. The overall area that is not knapped may extend to up to two thirds of its length.
- Bifaces with basal cortex coverage—Only the artefact's base is covered with cortex, which does not cover more than a third of total length. In some cases the cortex is present on both the base and one side, thereby affecting one edge: such tools are called "natural backed". De Mortillet emphasised the importance of the presence or absence of the cortex around the edge in the 19th century: "Even on some of the best worked pieces it is common to see, sometimes on the base but more often on the side, a small area that has not been worked, that is uncut. It could be thought that this is a mistake or an error. But often the most probable reason for this is that it was intentional. There are a large number of hand axes with an uncut base, unworked or partially cleaned ... an area has intentionally been left on these pieces as a grip, it is called the heel. This heel acts as a handle as it is easy to grip". (This hypothesis remains unproven and is not commonly used.)

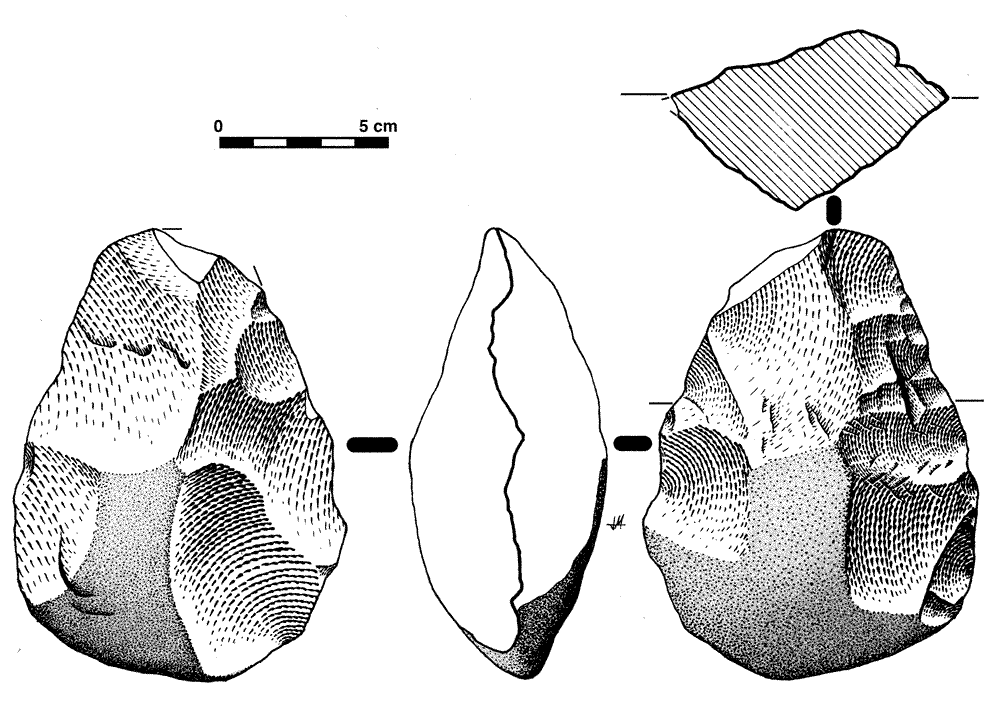
Hand axe with unworked base.

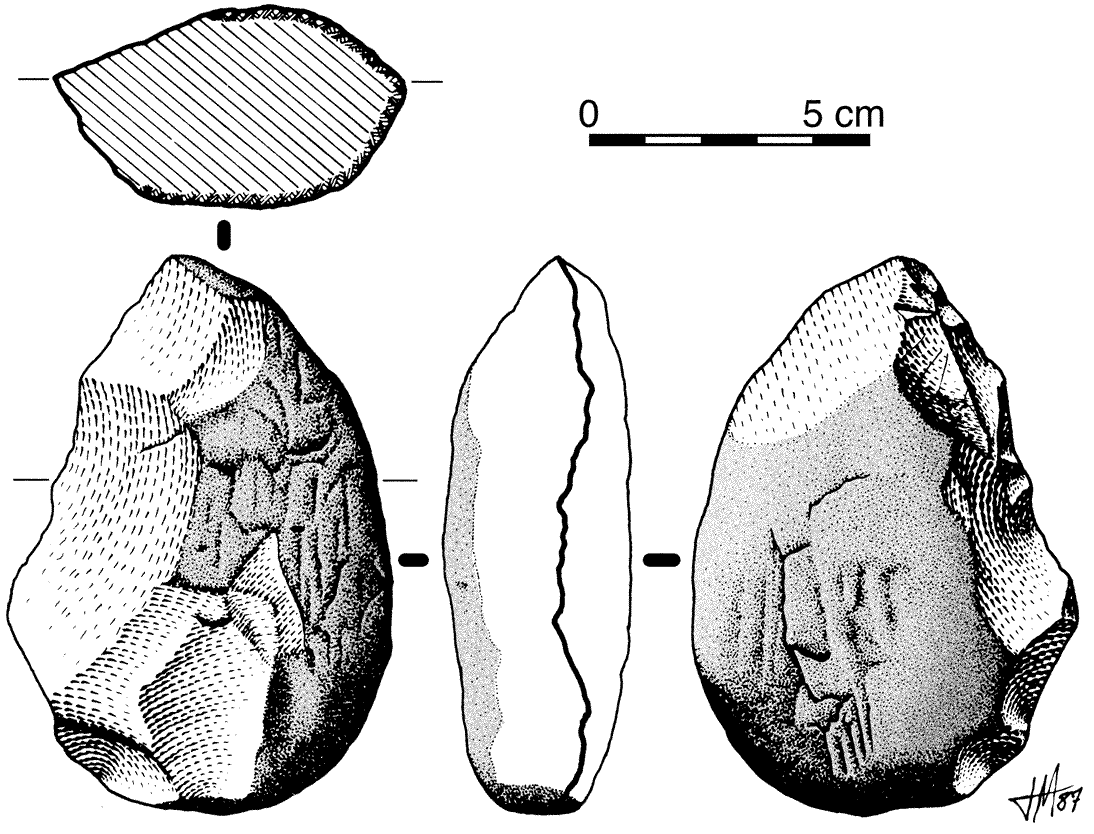
Biface with a lateral back.

- Hand axes with residual cortex on an edge—The whole of their edges are knapped except for a small area where the cortex remains (leaving a small area without a sharp edge). This area can be at the base, side or oblique. In all cases it is small, leaving cutting edges on both sides.
- Hand axes with a cutting edge around the whole circumference—The circumference is knapped to a cutting edge, although some residual areas of cortex may persist on either face, without affecting the cutting edge's effectiveness.

== Production ==
Older hand axes were produced by direct percussion with a stone hammer and can be distinguished by their thickness and a sinuous border. Mousterian hand axes were produced with a soft billet of antler or wood and are much thinner, more symmetrical and have a straight border. An experienced flintknapper needs less than 15 minutes to produce a good quality hand axe. A simple hand axe can be made from a beach pebble in less than 3 minutes.

The manufacturing process employs lithic reduction. This phase is commonly thought of as the most important in hand axe fabrication, although it is not always used, such as for hand axes made from flakes or a suitable tool stone. An important concern is the implement that has been used to form the biface. If multiple implements were used, it is essential to discover in what order they were used and the result obtained by each one. The most common implements are:

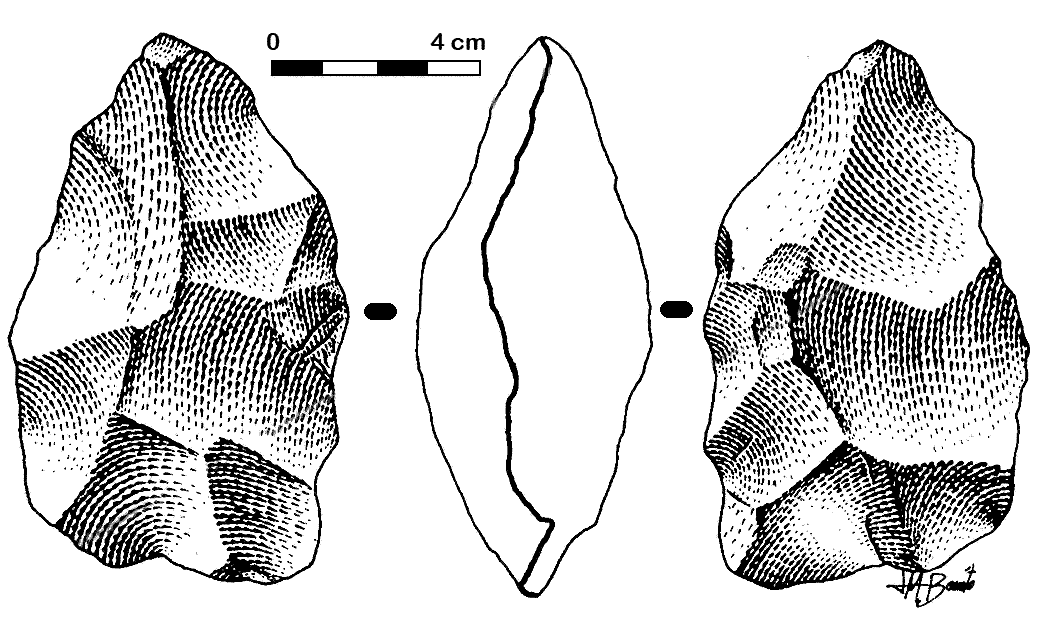
Hand axe formed using a hard hammer, without further treatment.

=== Hard hammer faces ===
Hand axes can be made without subsequent reworking of the edges. A hammerstone was the most common percussive tool used during the Acheulean. The resulting artefact is usually easily recognizable given its size and irregular edges, as the removed flakes leave pronounced percussion bulbs and compression rings. A hammerstone produces a small number of flakes that are wide and deep leaving long edges on the tool as their highly concave form yields curving edges. The cross-section is irregular, often sub-rhombic, while the intersection between the faces forms an acute angle of between 60° and 90° degrees. The shape is similar to that of the core as the irregularities formed during knapping are not removed. The notches obtained were exploited in the production sequence. It is common that this type of manufacture yields "partial bifaces" (an incomplete working that leaves many areas covered with cortex), "unifaces" (tools that have only been worked on one face), "bifaces in the Abbevillian style" and "nucleiform bifaces". This type of manufacturing style is generally an indication of the age when a tool was made and with other archaeological data can provide a context that allows its age to be estimated.

=== Hard hammer faces and edges ===
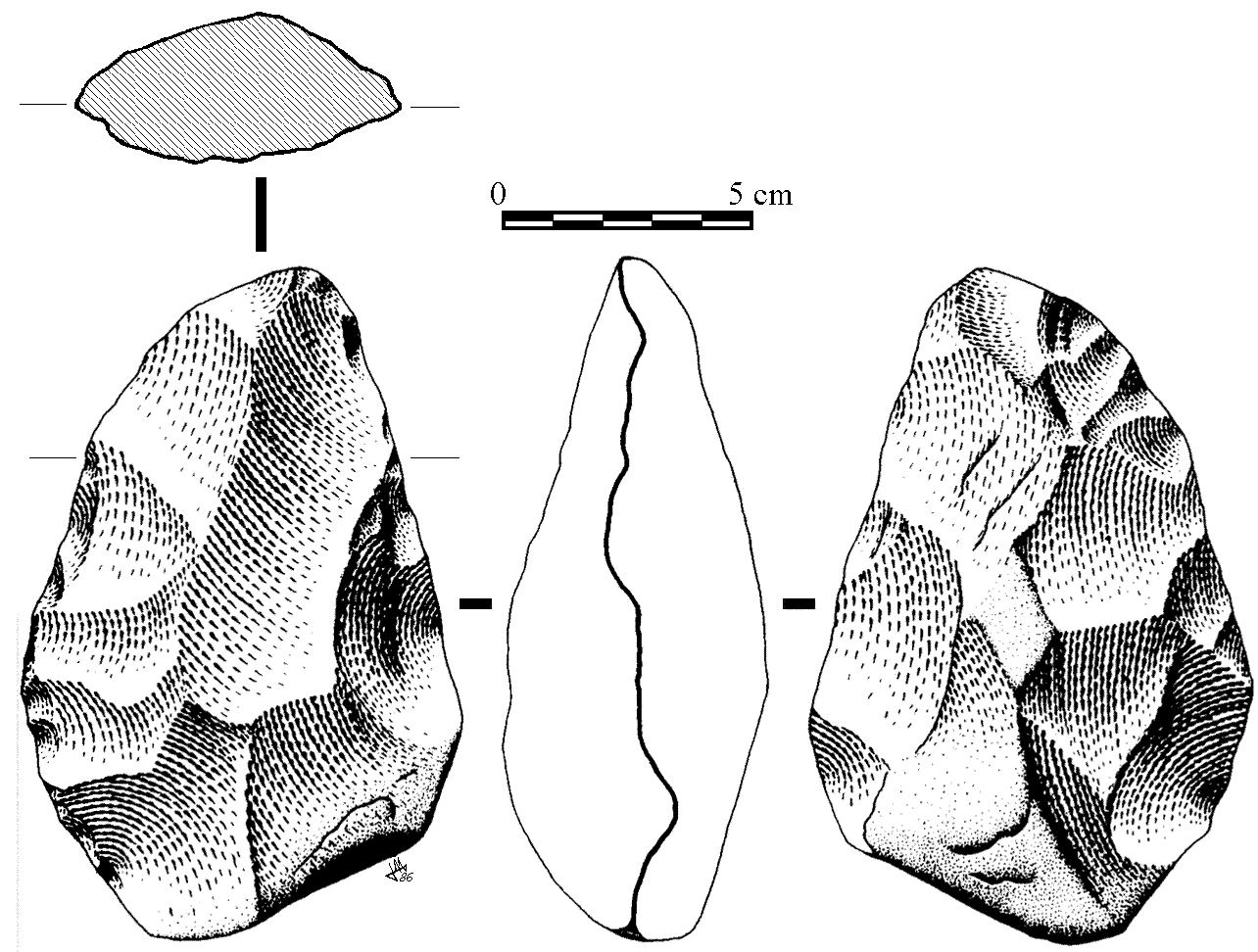
Hand axe formed using a hard hammer. The edges have also been worked using a hard hammer.

These hand axes have a more balanced appearance as the modification consists of a second (or third) series of blows to make the piece more uniform and provide a better finish. The modification is often called retouching and is sometimes carried out using invasive retouching or using softer, marginal, shallow blows that are only applied to the most marked irregularities leaving scale-like marks. The modification of edges with a hard hammer was carried out from the beginning of the Acheulean and persisted into the Mousterian. It is therefore not useful as an indicator of chronology (in order for it to be considered as a marker it has to be accompanied by other complementary and independent archaeological data). The hand axes arising from this methodology have a more classical profile with either a more symmetrical almond or oval shape and with a lower proportion of the cortex of the original core. It is not always the case that the retouching had the objective of reducing an edge's irregularities or deformities. In fact, it has been shown that in some cases the retouching was carried out to sharpen an edge that had been blunted by use or a point that had deteriorated.

=== Soft hammer finish ===
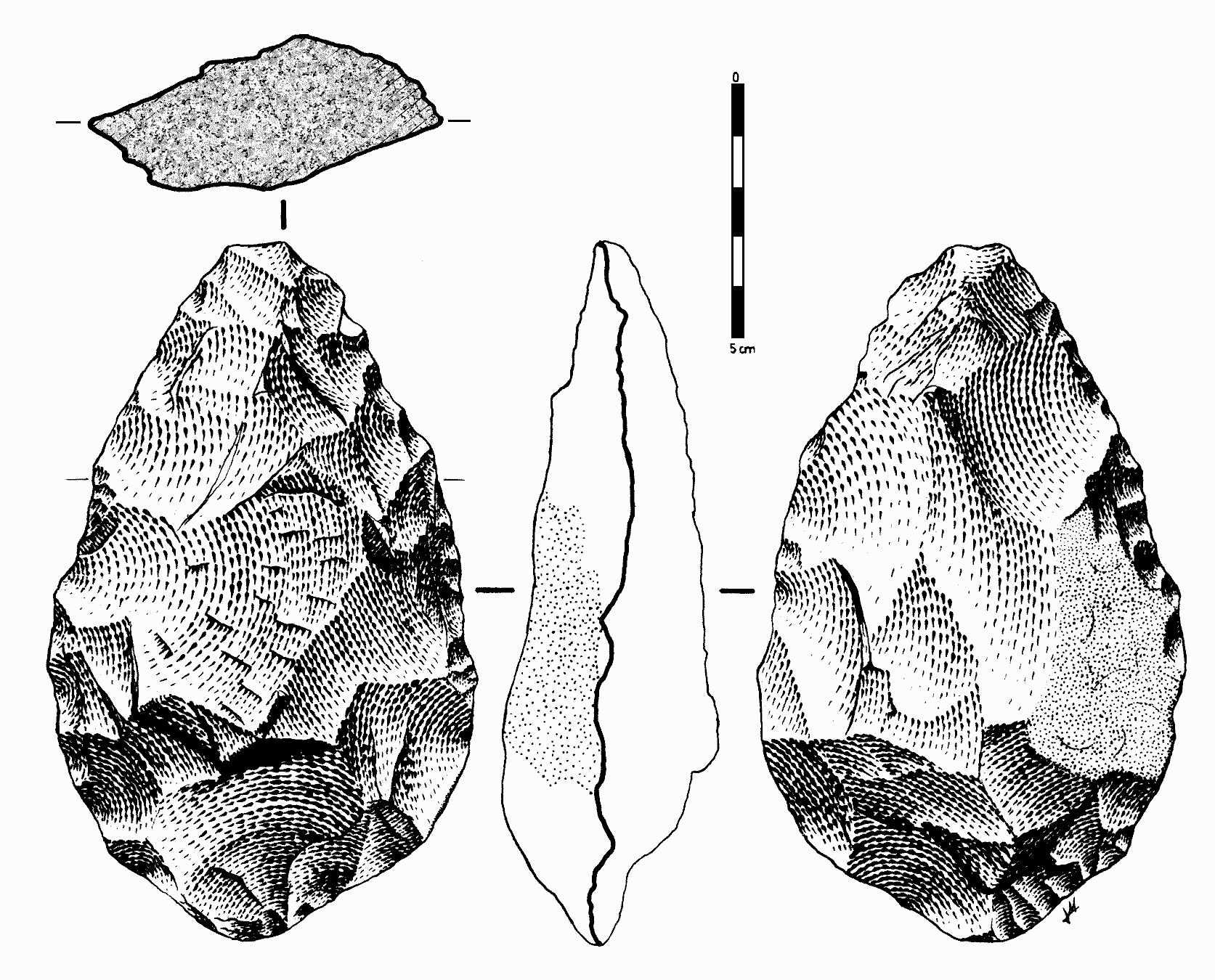
Hand axe probably roughed-out using a hard hammer and then retouched using a soft hammer.

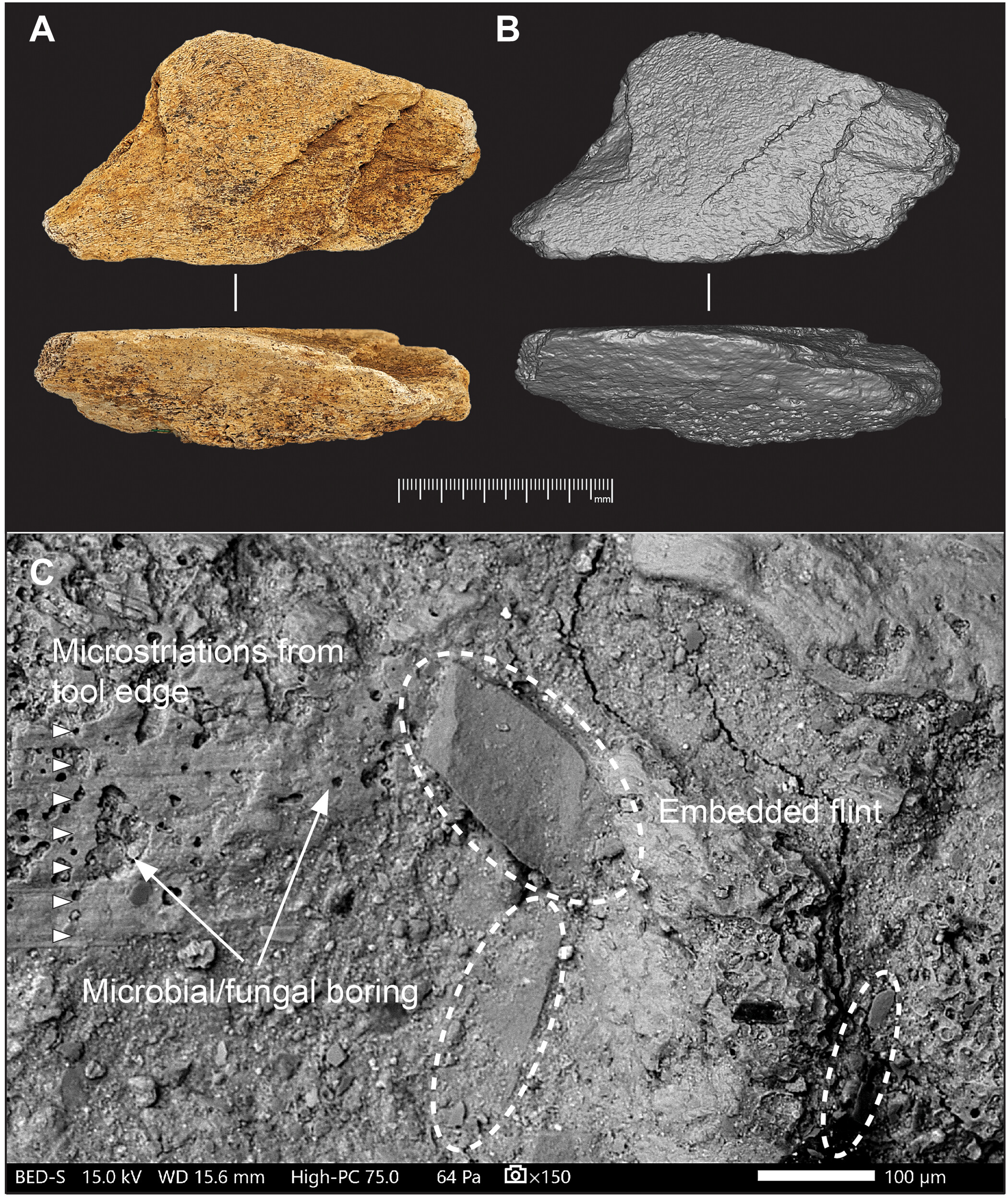
Soft hammer found at the Acheulean Boxgrove site, England made of the outer cortex of an elephant limb bone, with scanning electron microscope image showing flint chips embedded in the bone (bottom) as a result of its use

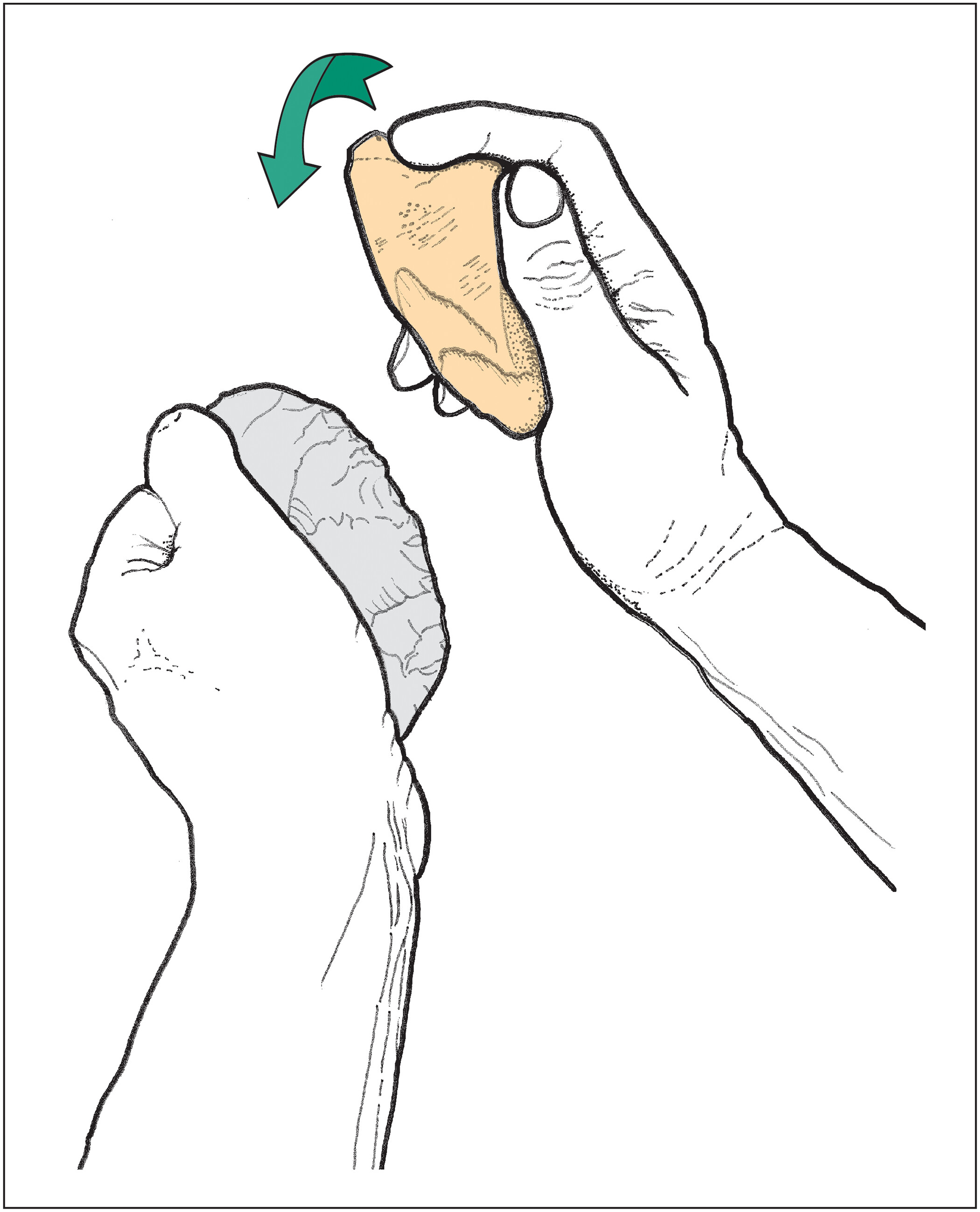
Proposed usage of the Boxgrove elephant bone soft hammer to resharpen hand axes

Some hand axes were formed with a hard hammer and finished with a soft hammer. Blows that result in deep conchoidal fractures (the first phase of manufacture) can be distinguished from features resulting from sharpening with a soft hammer. The latter leaves shallower, more distended, broader scars, sometimes with small, multiple shock waves. However, marks left by a small, hard hammer can leave similar marks to a soft hammer.

Soft hammer finished pieces are usually balanced and symmetrical, and can be relatively smooth. Soft hammer works first appeared in the Acheulean period, allowing tools with these markings to be used as a post quem estimation, but with no greater precision. The main advantage of a soft hammer is that a flintknapper is able to remove broader, thinner flakes with barely developed heels, which allows a cutting edge to be maintained or even improved with minimal raw material wastage. However, a high-quality raw material is required to make their use effective. No studies compare the two methods in terms of yield per unit weight of raw material, or the difference in energy use. The use of a soft hammer requires greater use of force by the flintknapper and a steeper learning curve, although it offers more flakes for less raw material.

=== Soft hammer only ===
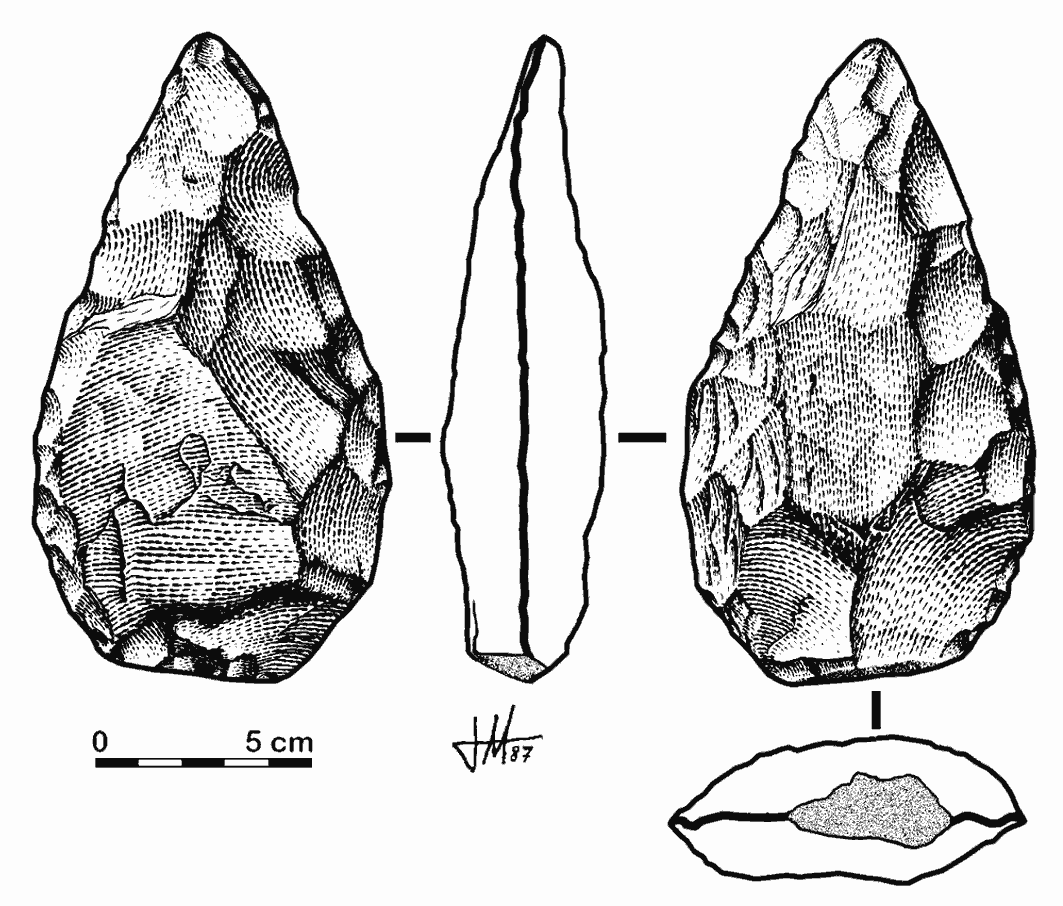
Hand axe manufactured with a soft hammer, without the appearance of any marks made by a hard hammer

Hand axes made using only a soft hammer are much less common. In most cases at least initial work was done with a hard hammer, before subsequent flaking with a soft hammer erased all vestiges of that work. A soft hammer is not suitable for all types of percussion platform and it cannot be used on certain types of raw material. It is, therefore, necessary to start with a hard hammer or with a flake as a core as its edge will be fragile (flat, smooth pebbles are also useful). This means that although it was possible to manufacture a hand axe using a soft hammer, it is reasonable to suppose that a hard hammer was used to prepare a blank followed by one or more phases of retouching to finish the piece. However, the degree of separation between the phases is not certain, as the work could have been carried out in one operation.

Working with a soft hammer allows a knapper greater control of the knapping and reduces waste of the raw material, allowing the production of longer, sharper, more uniform edges that will increase the tool's working life. Hand axes made with a soft hammer are usually more symmetrical and smooth, with rectilinear edges and shallow indentations that are broad and smooth so that it is difficult to distinguish where one flake starts and another ends. They generally have a regular biconvex cross-section and the intersection of the two faces forms an edge with an acute angle, usually of around 30°. They were worked with great skill and therefore they are more aesthetically attractive. They are usually associated with periods of highly developed tool making such as the Micoquien or the Mousterian. Soft hammer manufacturing is not reliable as the sole dating method.

Hand axes were created to be tools and as such they wore out, deteriorated and/or broke during use. Relics have suffered dramatic changes throughout their useful lives. It is common to find edges that have been sharpened, points that have been reconstructed and profiles that have been deformed by reworking in order to extend the piece's useful lifetime. Some tools were recycled later, leading Bordes to note that hand axes "are sometimes found in the Upper Palaeolithic. Their presence, which is quite normal in the Perigordian I, is often due, in other levels, to the collection of Mousterian or Acheulean tools."

== Morphology ==
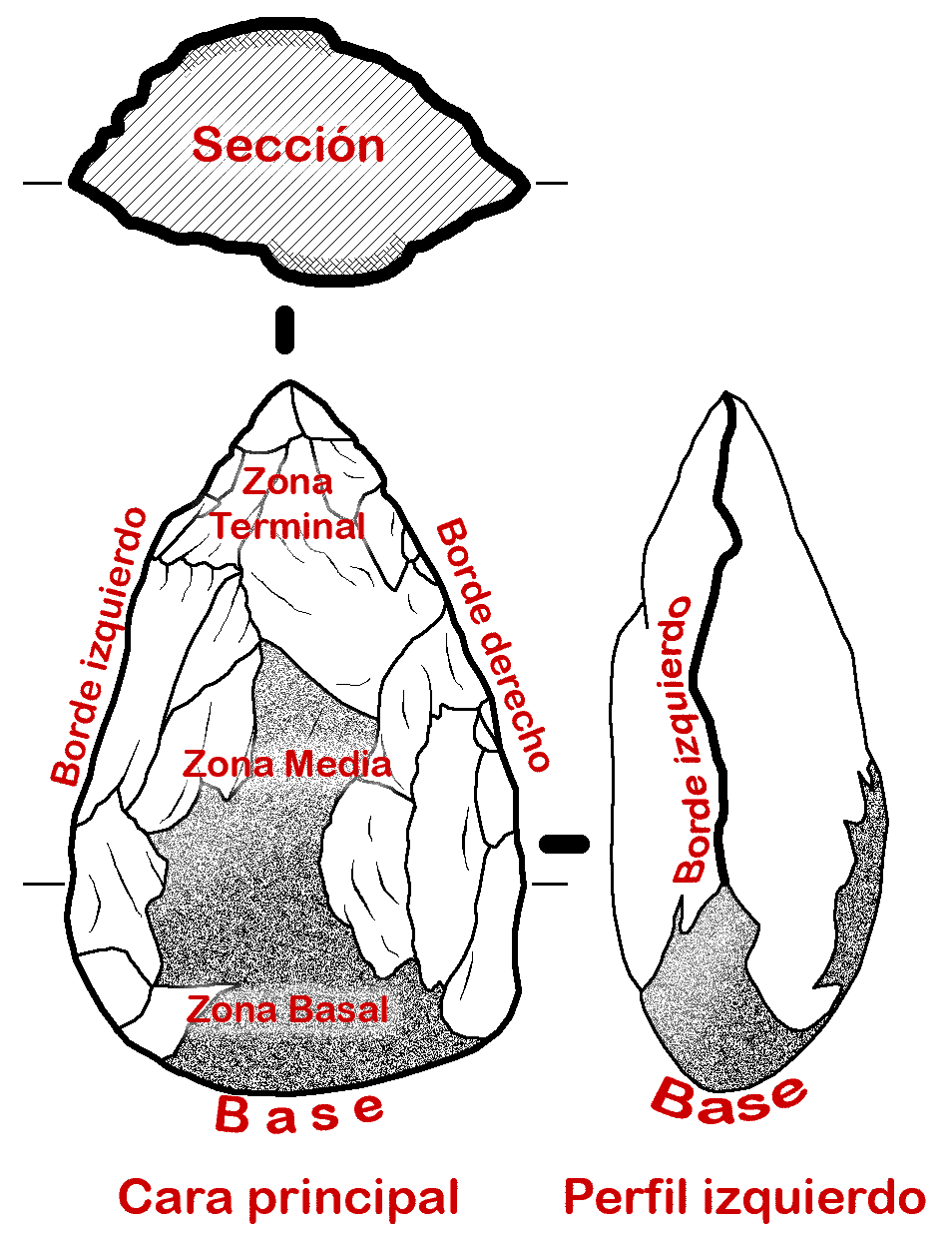
Basic scheme for the morphological description of an Acheulean hand axe.

Hand axes have traditionally been oriented with their narrowest part upwards (presupposing that this would have been the most active part, which is not unreasonable given the many hand axes that have unworked bases). The following typological conventions are used to facilitate communication. The axis of symmetry that divides a biface in two is called the morphological axis. The main face is usually the most regular and better worked face. The base (not the heel) is the bottom of the hand axe.

- Terminal zone—the narrowest end, opposite the base. Its most common shape is pointed, more or less acute or oval. Some hand axes have terminal ends that are rounded or polygonal (i.e. not pointed) while others have terminal ends that are transversal to the axis, called cleaver or spatulate.
- Proximal end (base)—opposite the terminal end (usually broader and thicker), it can be described as either reserved (partially or totally worked, but not cut); or cut, with a rounded (polygonal), flat or pointed end.
- Edges—convex, rectilinear or concave, and more or less even. Edges on some specimens are denticulate—scalloped—or notched. Some specimens have unsharpened edges. The profile of a hand axe's worked edges can be regular without pronounced rectilinear deviations (the edge is gently curved in the form of an S) or an edge may be more sinuous and wave-formed with pronounced curves or deviations in the edge's profile. On some specimens only selected areas have been formed into a working edge.
- Cross section—the horizontal cross-section taken at some distance from the base. It is possible to discern retouching or rebuilding in deteriorated parts of the edges. The following types of cross section are commonly seen: triangular (sub-triangular and backed triangular), rhombic (rhomboidal and backed rhomboidal), trapezium (trapezoid and backed trapezoidal), pentagon (pentagonal and backed pentagonal), polygonal, biconvex or lenticular (sub lenticular).
- Profile—By definition, hand axes have a roughly balanced outline, with a morphological axis that also serves as an axis of bilateral symmetry and a plane that serves as an axis of bifacial symmetry. Not all hand axes are perfectly symmetrical. Symmetry was achieved only after millennia of development. Symmetry may not make tools more useful. Hand axes were used in a variety of heavy physical tasks. They deteriorated, wore out and broke and were often repaired with retouching of their edges, recovery of their points or complete reworking. The majority of discovered pieces are remains, pieces that have been discarded after a long life as tools, during which they often were damaged and/or adapted for specialized tasks. Such pieces may have lost whatever symmetry they initially had. Hand axe profiles can be classified into the following categories:

Biface profiles
Triangular	Amygdaloidal	Cordiform	Lanceolate	Micoquien
Discoid	Ovoid	Elliptical	Naviform	Rhombic
Splitter	Spatulate	Abbevillian	Nucleiform	Others

=== Dimensions and ratios ===
Basic dimensions to be measured on an Acheulean hand axe.

Hand axe measurements use the morphological axis as a reference and for orientation. In addition to length, width, depth, specialists have proposed a wide range of other physical quantities. The most common were proposed by Bordes and Balout:

- Maximum length (L)
- Maximum width (m)
- Maximum depth (e)
- Distance from the base to the zone with the maximum width (a)
- Width 3/4 of the way along the piece (o)

A and o can be used to delineate the contour's cross section and to measure the angles of the edges (provided this is not an area covered in the stone's original cortex). These angular measurements for the edges are made using a goniometer.

Edge length, weight and the length of the chord described by the edges (if the piece has a transverse terminal bezel) can be measured. These measurements allow morphological and technical ratios to be established (for example, the relationship between the weight and the length of the cutting edges, or the relationship between the hammer used to form the piece and the angle obtained etc.).

The most commonly used coefficients were established by Bordes for the morphological-mathematical classification of what he called "classic bifaces" (Balout proposed other, similar indices):

- Base-rounding index—allows classic bifaces to be separated into triangular, almond-shaped and oval families. The L/a ratio provides the following separation thresholds:
  Family	Threshold
  Triangular bifaces (the most regular) or sub triangular (for the irregular ones)	${\frac{L}{a}}<2.75$
  Almond-shaped bifaces	$2.75<{\frac{L}{a}}<3.75$
  Oval bifaces	$3.75<{\frac{L}{a}}$
- Elongation index—separates common bifaces from the short (and, occasionally, from the elongated). For example, within the family of Oval bifaces the index distinguishes discoidal bifaces from other types; in the Almond-shaped bifaces it identifies lanceolate or micoquien bifaces. The index is calculated using L/m. Thresholds:
  Elongation	Threshold
  Short bifaces	${\frac{L}{m}}<1.3$
  Common bifaces	$1,3<{\frac{L}{m}}<1.6$
  Elongated bifaces	$1.6<{\frac{L}{m}}$
- Cross-sectional/planar index—divides the thick bifaces from the flat ones and is used only on certain types. In the Almond-shaped bifaces (along with the elongation index) it distinguishes the amygdaloid bifaces (thick) from the cordiform bifaces (flat). The index is calculated using m/e. Thresholds:
  Cross section	Threshold
  Thick bifaces	${\frac{m}{e}}<2.35$
  Flat bifaces	${\frac{m}{e}}>2.35$
- Other indexes apply to the other types of bifaces (partial bifaces, bifaces with an unworked base, or cleaver, spatulate, Abbevillean, nucleiform, etc.).

== Bordes hand axe typology ==
Hand axes are so varied that they do not actually have a single common characteristic… [...] Despite the numerous attempts to classify hand axes, some of which date to the beginning of the [20th] century... their study does not comply completely satisfactorily to any typological list

— Gabriel Camps

The following guide is strongly influenced by the possibly outdated and basically morphological "Bordes method" classification system. This classification is particularly applicable to classic hand axes, (Note: The Bordes typology singularly fails for cleavers and biface-cleavers, demonstrating an aspect of both types of tool, especially the cleavers, previously faced with more coherence by a classification scheme posed by Bordes' colleague Jacques Tixier.) those that can be defined and catalogued by measuring dimensions and mathematical ratios, while disregarding nearly all subjective criteria. "Distinguishing between different types of hand axes is not always easy. There is often no room for doubts, however, there are a number of cases where the difficulty is real." In the majority of cases, this system agrees with previously established categories (although slightly redefining them). Balout made a similar attempt at categorization.

Group	Image	Type
Triangular		Triangular The triangular bifaces were initially defined by Henri Breuil as flat based, globular, covered with cortex, with two straight edges that converge at an acute apical zone. Bordes later redefined the definition, making it more narrow. For Bordes a triangular biface is a piece of developed, working and balanced morphology; they are flat pieces with three rectilinear or slightly convex edges, they must be flat (m/e > 2.35) and with a short, straight base (base rounding index L/a < 2.5). Specialists distinguish small variations within these strict limits such as elongated triangular (L/m < 1.6), or pieces with slightly concave edges. Bordes named the latter shark's teeth for their similarity to the fossilized teeth of Carcharodon megalodon that often appear near to the archaeological sites where these tools were found. The sub triangular bifaces, have a general form similar to a triangle but are more irregular and less symmetrical. Triangular bifaces are scarce in the Lower Palaeolithic (except in the late Acheulean in some French regions) and although they are more common during the Middle Palaeolithic (especially during the Mousterian), they virtually disappear without trace.
Almond-shaped		Amygdaloidal They are the most common biface in this group, defined by their almond shape, symmetrical tendency and metric indices common to this category. Apart from their shape, which gives them their name (Latin for almond), they are bifaces of regular length (1.3 < L/m < 1.6), somewhat thick (m/e < 2.35) and with an average base roundness index for this category (2.75 < L/a < 3.75). The base may be unworked or worked. They may have a sharp-pointed or oval apical zone. In some cases it may be slightly rounded (and narrow). Amygdaloidal bifaces are nearly identical to cordiform bifaces, except that the former are thick and the latter are flat. Amygdaloidal bifaces usually have a coarse finish and high-degree of cortex coverage. This is not necessarily an indication of development or chronology.
Almond-shaped		Cordiform A cordiform biface is identical to the amygdaloidal when seen from the front, as it shares the same index values (elongation index: 1.3 < L/m < 1.6; and base roundness index: 2.75 < L/a < 3.75). When seen from the side it appears to be a flat biface (m/e > 2.35). Occasionally, although this is not defining, they are worked with greater skill, better finished, with less cortex and greater balance. They may also have more acute, rectilinear edges increasing efficiency. Their name, which comes from the Latin cor (heart), was suggested by de Perthes in 1857. It became generally used when adopted by Breuil, Commont and Goury in the 1920s. Bordes defined them mathematically as flat bifaces with rounded, short bases and a pointed or oval terminal zone. He defined eight variants, including an elongated form (L/m > 1.6) and another that is more irregular that has been called subcordiform. The cordiform bifaces were common in both the Acheulean and the Mousterian.
Almond-shaped		Lanceate Lanceate bifaces are the most aesthetically pleasing and became the typical image of developed Acheulean bifaces. Their name is due to their similar shape to the blade of a lance. It was coined by de Perthes (lance axe). Bordes defined a lanceate biface as elongated (L/m > 1.6) with rectilinear or slightly convex edges, acute apex and rounded base (2.75 < L/a < 3.75). They are often globular to the extent that it is not a flat surface (m/e < 2.35), at least in its basal zone. They are usually balanced and well finished, with straightened ground edges. They are highly characteristic of the latter stages of the Acheulean – or the Micoquian, as it is known – and of the Mousterian in the Acheulean Tradition (closely related to the Micoquian bifaces described below). A biface with a lanceate profile that is more coarsely worked and irregular, possibly due to a lack of finishing it is usually called a ficron style biface from the French term.
Almond-shaped		Micoquien The Micoquian biface receives its name from the French cave of La Micoque in the community of Les Eyzies-de-Tayac (in the Dordogne), which also gave its name to a period at the end of the Acheulean, the Micoquien. This period is characterized by the technological development. It is thought that the Micoquien was not a separate culture from the Acheulean, but one of its final phases, and that Micoquian bifaces may be one of the few biface types that can be used as a chronological marker, a so-called index artifact. The biface is characteristic of the end of the Acheulean and was developed during the Riss-Würm interglacial. Micoquien bifaces are similar to lanceate ones, they are almond-shaped (2.75 < L/a < 3.75), elongated L/m > 1.6) and thick (m/e < 2.35) with a rounded, often unworked base, but with markedly concave edges and an acute point. Lanceate and Micoquian bifaces are usually associated. It is possible that reiterated sharpening of a lanceate biface gave rise to a Micoquian biface. They are common across the Old World.
Oval		Discoid Discoid bifaces are entirely circular or oval in shape and are characterized by a base rounding index of greater than 3.75 and an elongation index of less than 1.3. They are rounded both at their base as well as at their terminal zone. If their manufactured form is shallow, they are difficult to distinguish from discoid cores of centripetal extraction, or if they are simple bifaces they look like simple flakes that have been retouched or chopping tools made from flakes. This type of biface commonly arises from the continuous resharpening of the active region of a longer biface, that over time becomes shorter. They can also be broken specimens that were recycled and reworked. Discoid bifaces cannot be used as indexes, although particularly finely worked examples appear among the Solutrean culture in Périgord.
Oval		Ovoid Ovoid bifaces are roughly oval (a kind of curve whose description is slightly ambiguous, but which is more or less egg-shaped). De Perthes published a definition in 1857 that is little changed. Bordes stated that ovoid bifaces are similar to discoids but more elongated (1.3 < L/m < 1.6) and logically have a base rounding index related to the oval bifaces (greater than 3.75). Both the base and the terminal zone are rounded (if the base is short they are almost symmetrical), although the greatest width is below the longitudinal midway point. Ovoid bifaces apparently appeared in the middle of the Acheulean, although they are not index artifacts and along with the amygdaloids are the most common type of biface among the Acheulean cultures.
Oval		Elliptical Elliptical bifaces are also known as Limandes (from the French word limande, the name of a type of flounder). They have three axes of symmetry, bilateral, bifacial and horizontal. If the base is short they are virtually identical at the terminal end, complicating identifying top from bottom. In practice their dimensional ratios are equal to the ovoid tools, except that the elliptical bifaces are usually more elongated (L/m > 1.6) and their maximum width (m) is nearer to their mid length. Elliptical bifaces are found throughout the Acheulean and into the Mousterian. The finishing became more careful and balanced over time. Bordes usually differentiated flat elliptical bifaces (m/e > 2.35, true Limandes) from thick elliptical bifaces (m/e < 2.35, Protolimandes).

=== Non-classic specimens ===
Many specimens defeat objective classification. Bordes created a group he called "non-classic bifaces" to which mathematical indexes do not apply.

- Nucleiform bifaces—It is difficult to distinguish a true biface from a core with modified edges that was occasionally used as a tool. A piece could also be a blank or a chance occurrence. Despite their rough appearance, nucleiform bifaces were present in both the Acheulean and the Mousterian.
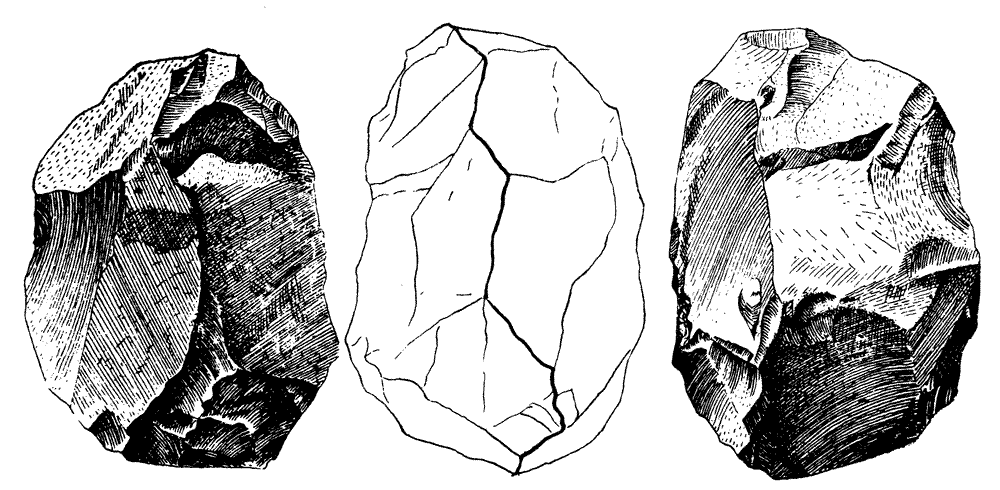
  Nucleiform biface from the Acheulean site at Torralba, in Soria (Spain).
- Cleaver bifaces—These bifaces have an apex that is neither pointed nor rounded. They possess a relatively wide terminal edge that is transverse to the morphological axis. This edge is usually more or less sub-rectilinear, slightly concave or convex. They are sometimes included within the classic types as they have a balanced, well-finished form. Cleaver-bifaces were defined by Chavaillón in 1958 as "biface with terminal bevel" (biface à biseau terminal), while Bordes simply called them "cleavers" (hachereaux). The current term was proposed in French by Guichard in 1966 (biface-hachereau). The term "biface-cleaver" was proposed in Spanish in 1982 (bifaz-hendidor), with "biface" used as a noun referring to the typological group a piece belongs to due to its bifacial modelling and "cleaver" used as an adjective because of its morphology. Technically they are bifaces, but morphologically they are similar to cleavers, although their personality is completely distinct:
  Some authors count them as cleavers Bordes 1961, p. 63, which J. Chavaillon does not agree with; the carving technique used to create a biface is not in any way similar to the manufacturing process for cleavers
  — Alimen
  The multi-use capability of a biface, including this type, conflicts with the technological simplicity of a cleaver, even though their morphology and function may be similar.
- Abbevillean style bifaces—This hand axe takes its name from the French municipality of Abbeville, where they were first found in a marl quarry in the valley of the River Somme. They were initially associated with Abbevillean culture, for which they are an index fossil (although paradoxically these hand axes are particularly scarce at the Abbeville site). The Abbevillean is an initial archaic phase of the Archulean, even if it does not always appear in the stratigraphic register. Archaic hand axes such as those from Abbeville can be found throughout the Lower Palaeolithic, without this suggesting any chronological or cultural reference, supporting the term Abbevillean style biface. These hand axes were worked using only a hard hammer, without retouching, leaving them sinuous. They are asymmetrical, varied and irregular, with their shape generally determined by the stone's own shape. Their base is covered by cortex along with large areas of the sides. They tend to be relatively thick.
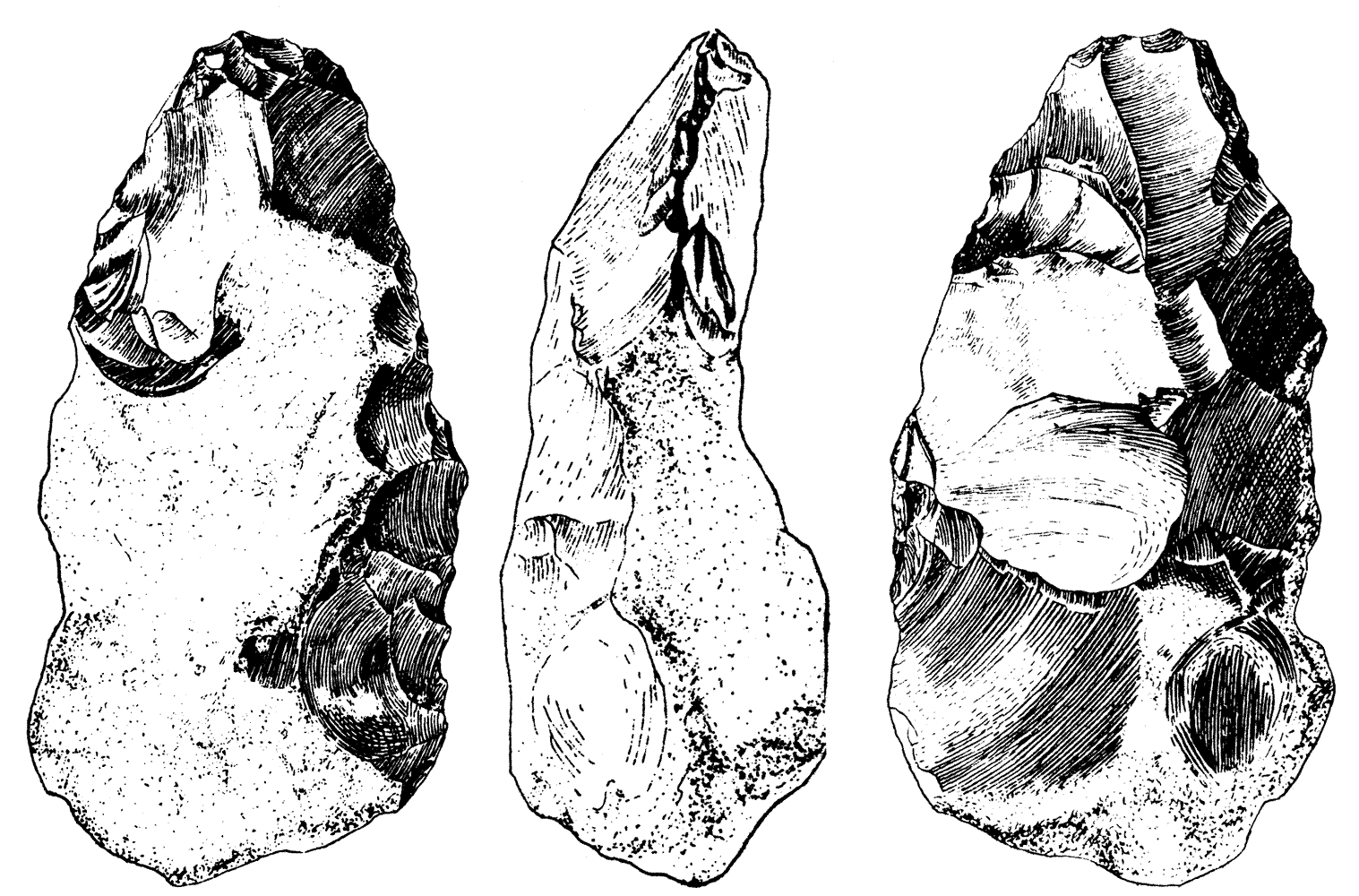
  Abbevillean style biface from the Acheulean archaeological site of San Isidro, in Madrid (Spain)
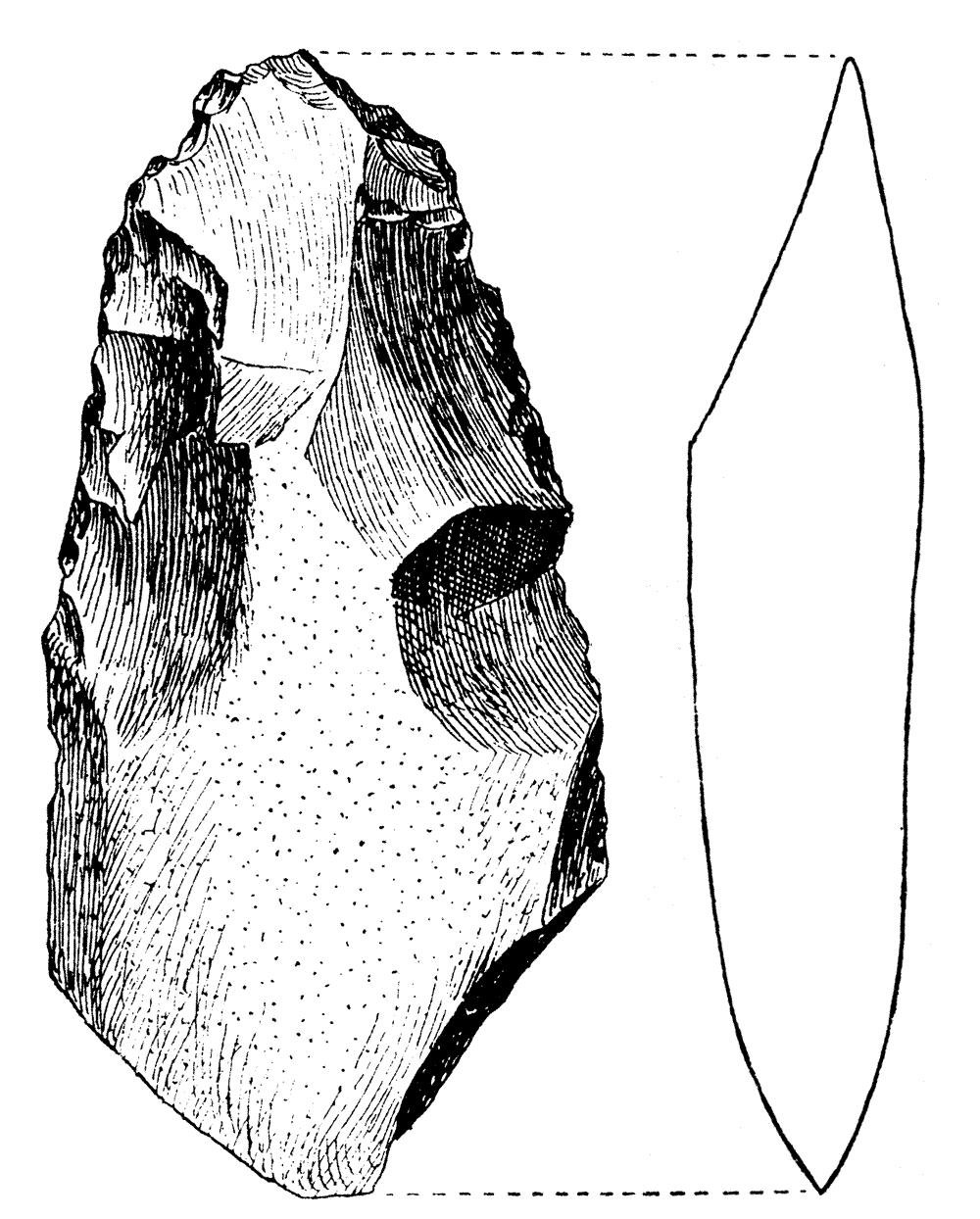
  Partial biface from the Acheulean strata of the Manzanares valley in Madrid (Spain)
- Partial bifaces: These are without knapping affecting more than a small part of the core. They were created with only a few blows, although this depends on the correct core choice. They are often barely recognizable as chopping tools, but their general aspect and finishing qualifies them as bifaces. The extreme age of the industry to which they belong and the economy of effort serve to qualify them:
  A knapping so incomplete, but so careful, added to the morphology of the core, allows us to talk of a finished hand axe, that was not worked more because it was not necessary, thereby saving energy.
  — Benito del Rey and Benito Álvarez

=== Tools sometimes categorized as bifaces ===
Hand axes constitute an important group artefacts from the Acheulean. They are particularly important in open air archaeological sites (Keelley suggested that they are less common in cave sites). Hand axes, chopping tools and trihedral picks are considered core utensils, which were commonly manufactured out of stones, blocks or rock nodules. However this grouping is problematic as these tools were often also fabricated from (large) flakes. Another common suggestion is to refer to flake tools as micro industry, as opposed to the more general size referred to as macro industry, which includes hand axes and cleavers. However, some scrapers are as big as hand axes.

- The most elaborated chopping tools and partial hand axes are linked and it is often difficult to distinguish between them. The concept of chopping tools is based on their lack of formal standardization (which is typical of hand axes) and includes the possibility that the pieces are shallow cores, which is unthinkable for the bifaces (except the nucleiforms).
- While hand axes and cleavers occasionally served for similar tasks, their design is fundamentally different.
- Trihedral picks are no longer considered a specialized type of hand axe.

Another group of tools commonly associated with hand axes is the biface leafpoint tools from the Lower and Middle Palaeolithic in the Old World. The difference between the two types is based on the latter's fine, light finishing with a soft hammer and in a morphology that suggests a specific function, possibly as the point of a projectile or a knife. Representatives of these tools include well known examples from the specialized literature:

The term leaf piece should be prefixed to leaf point, as many of them are not pointed. They have been found sporadically in a number of Mousterian sites in France, but they are most common in central European Mousterian sites and African sites from the end of the Aterian

— Bordes

- The biface leafpoint tools of central Europe are called Blattspitzen (lit. 'leaf points'). They are projectile points belonging to the Middle Palaeolithic with a leaf-shaped form. They are often dual pointed and flat, making them similar to Solutrean laurel leaf blades. It is possible to distinguish the two only from their archaeological context. Blattspitzen survived in some Upper Palaeolithic cultures. The pieces from the eastern European Szeletien culture (both Blattspitzen and Micoquian bifaces) could be the link that connects the tradition of Lower and Middle Palaeolithic bifacial objects with those from the Upper Palaeolithic and beyond.
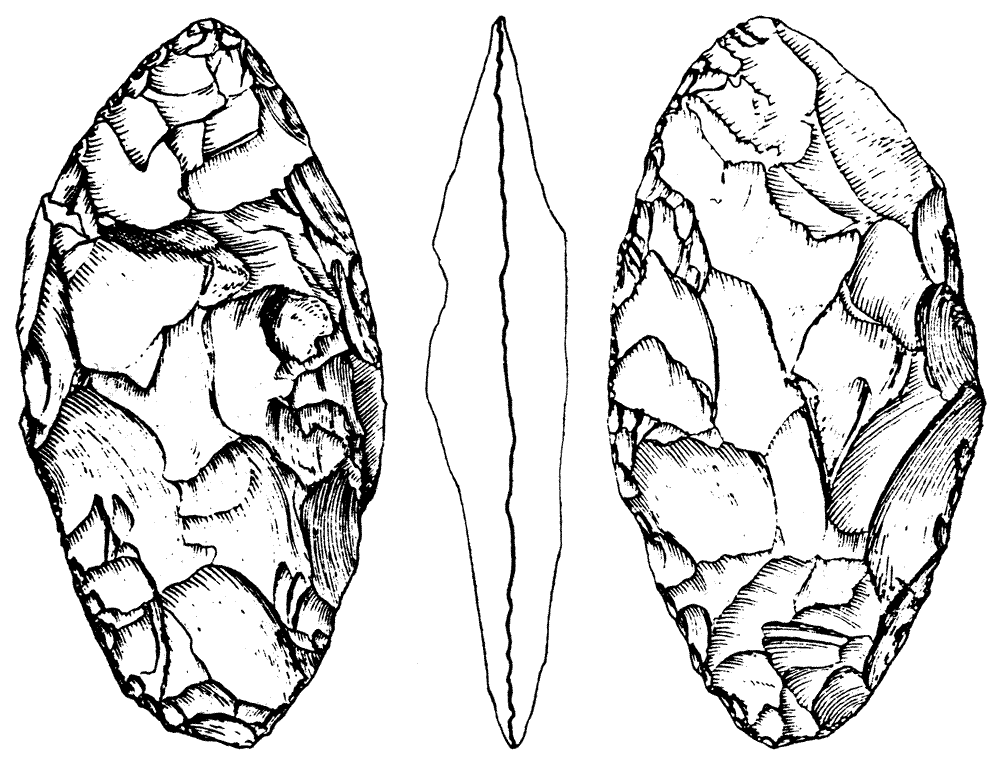
  Central European blattspitzen
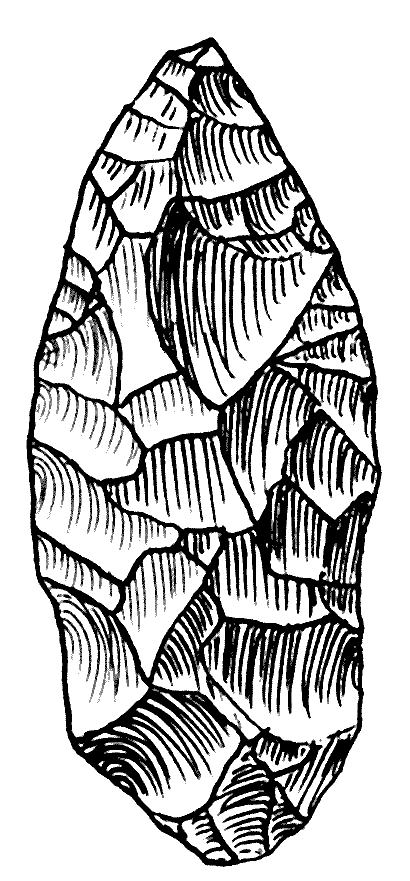
  Aterian leafpoint piece
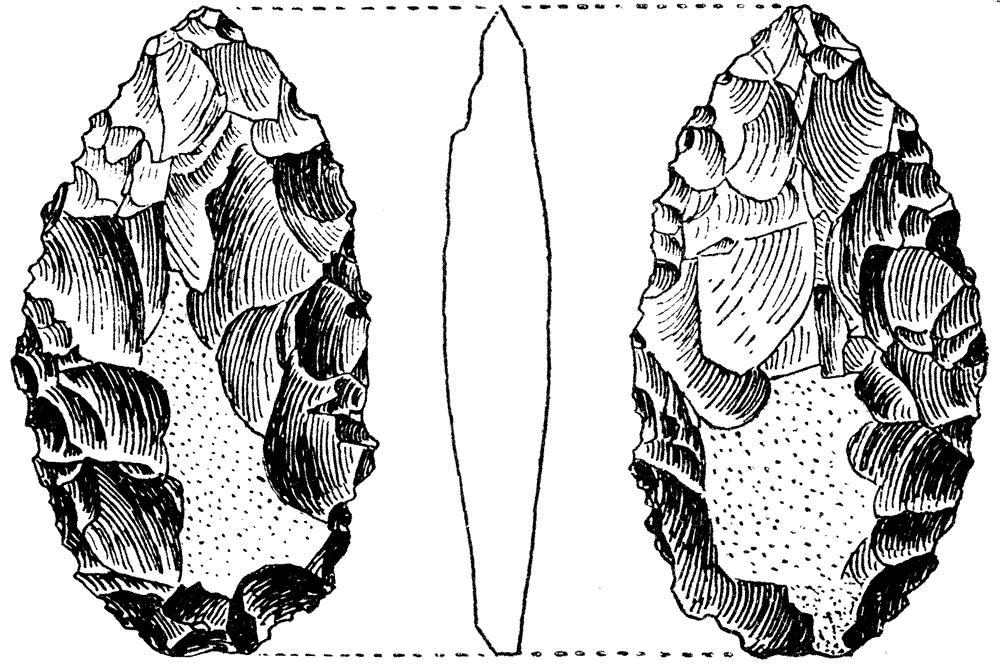
  Stillbay leafpoint piece
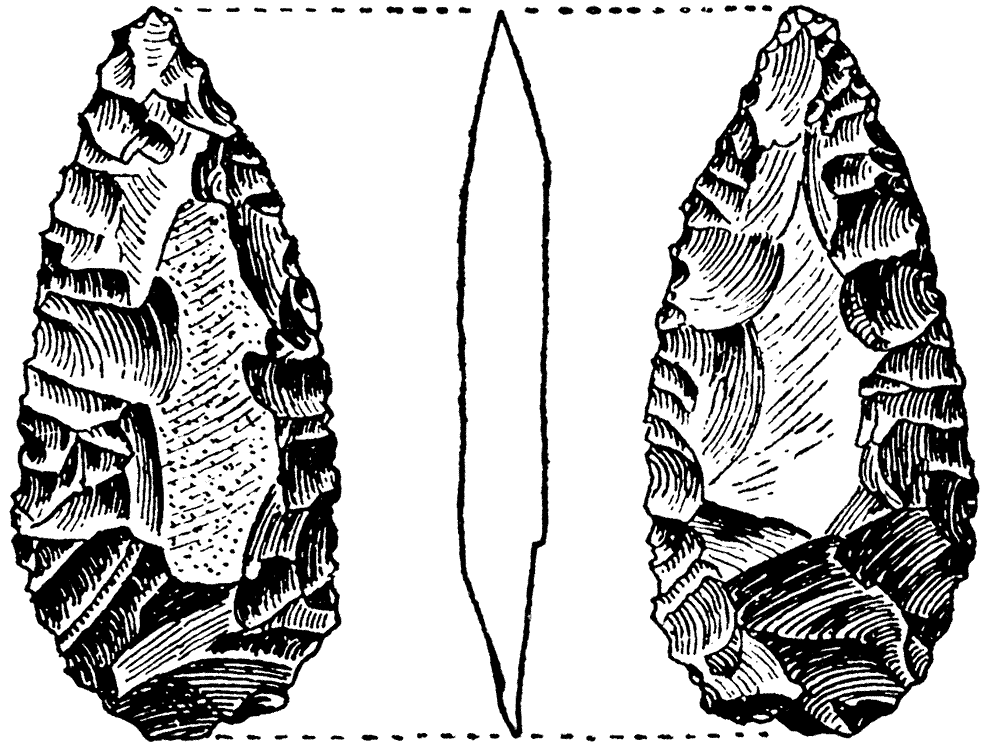
  Leafpoint piece, S'baikia, Algeria
- Hand axes found in Africa come from both the Aterian culture of North Africa and the Stillbay culture from East Africa. Both these cases relate to Mousterian cultures, although they are relatively late and have their own style, at the end of the so-called African Middle Stone Age. In both cases a variety of objects are found, triangular, oval and other leaf-point. Hand axes and unifaces also came from other cultures.

== Importance ==
The hand axe helped establish that early humans were capable of constructing relatively sophisticated tools that also reflected a sense of aesthetics. The 19th century publications of Frere, and more importantly of Boucher de Perthes, in France, described pieces that were balanced, symmetrical and crafted with a formal purity. Vilanova i Piera published similar works in Spain. This work was continued by Pérez de Barradas and del Prado at the start of the 20th century.

Art passed through a long formative period before becoming beautiful; but this does not mean that it ever stopped being a sincere and grandiose art, sometime more sincere and grandiose than beautiful; in mankind there is a creative nature that is manifested as soon as its existence is assured. When he was not worried or fearful, this demigod acting in tranquillity, found the material in his surroundings to breathe life into his spirit.

— Goethe, Conversations with Eckermann.

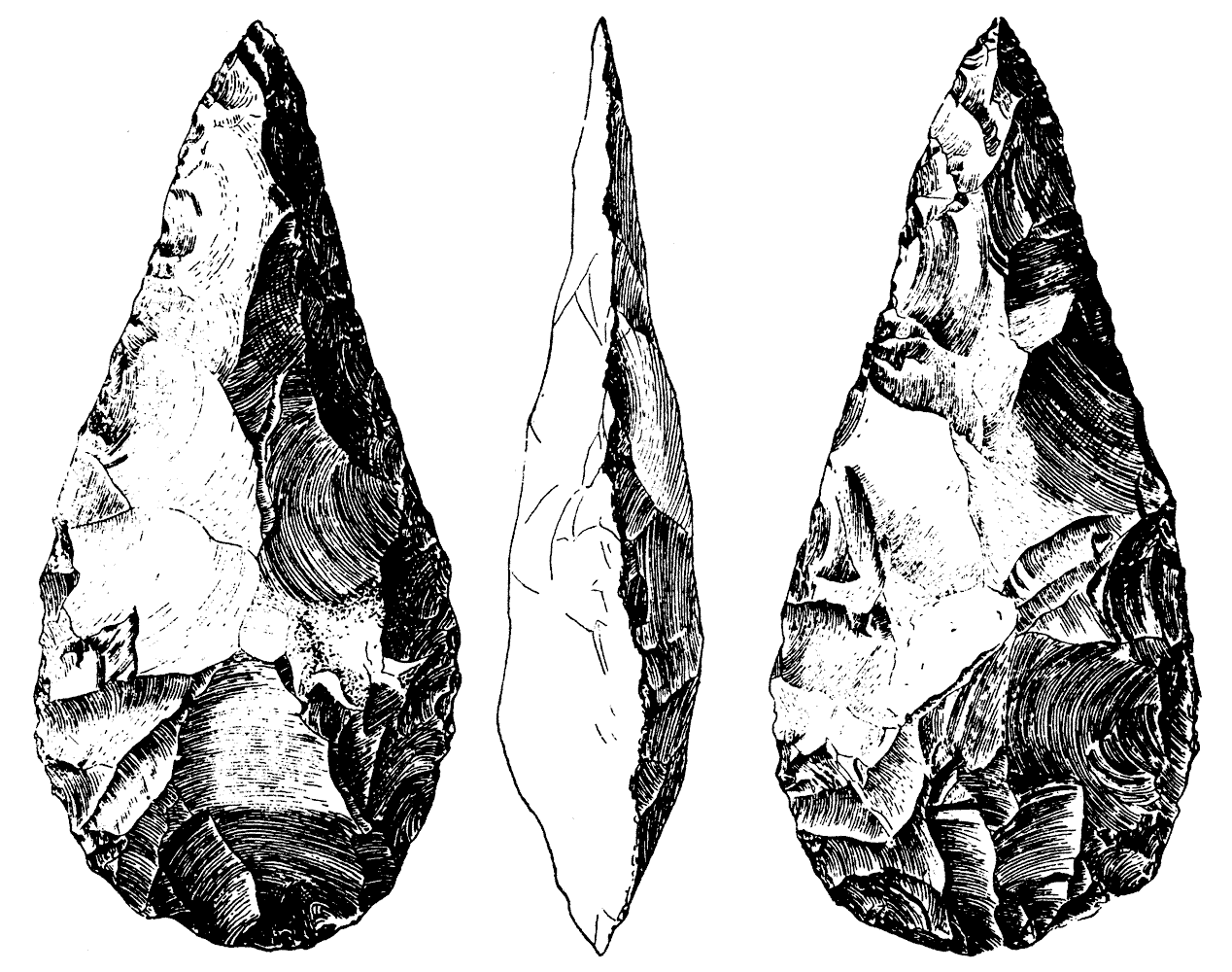
Finely worked lanceate hand axe from the San Isidro site near Madrid

As Leroi-Gourhan explained, it is important to ask what was understood of art at the time, considering the psychologies of non-modern humans. Archaeological records documenting rapid progress towards symmetry and balance surprised Leroi-Gourha. He felt that he could recognize beauty in early prehistoric tools made during the Acheulean:

It seems difficult to admit that these beings did not experience a certain aesthetic satisfaction, they were excellent craftsmen that knew how to choose their material, repair defects, orient cracks with total precision, drawing out a form from a crude flint core that corresponded exactly to their desire. Their work was not automatic or guided by a series of actions in strict order, they were able to mobilize in each moment reflection and, of course, the pleasure of creating a beautiful object.

— Leroi-Gourhan

Many authors who comment on the Westfield aspect of hand axes refer only to exceptional pieces. The majority of hand axes tended to symmetry, but lack artistic appeal. Generally, only the most striking pieces are considered, mainly 19th or early 20th century collections. At that time a lack of knowledge regarding prehistoric technology prevented a recognition of human actions in these objects. Other collections were made by aficionados, whose interests were not scientific, so that they collected only objects they considered to be outstanding, abandoning humbler elements that were sometimes necessary to interpret an archaeological site. Exceptions include sites methodically studied by experts where magnificently carved, abundant hand axes caused archaeologists to express admiration for the artists:

Such is the perfection of the carving on some hand axes that they give the impression that the artist took great pleasure in them per se, at least apparently, as the working does not make the pieces any more efficient. At any rate, we are unable to pronounce from this remove whether it was art or the utility of the hand axe that was being sought by making them so well. Although, in our heart of hearts we are sure that they were searching for beauty, aesthetics, as they could have achieved the same efficiency with cruder pieces.

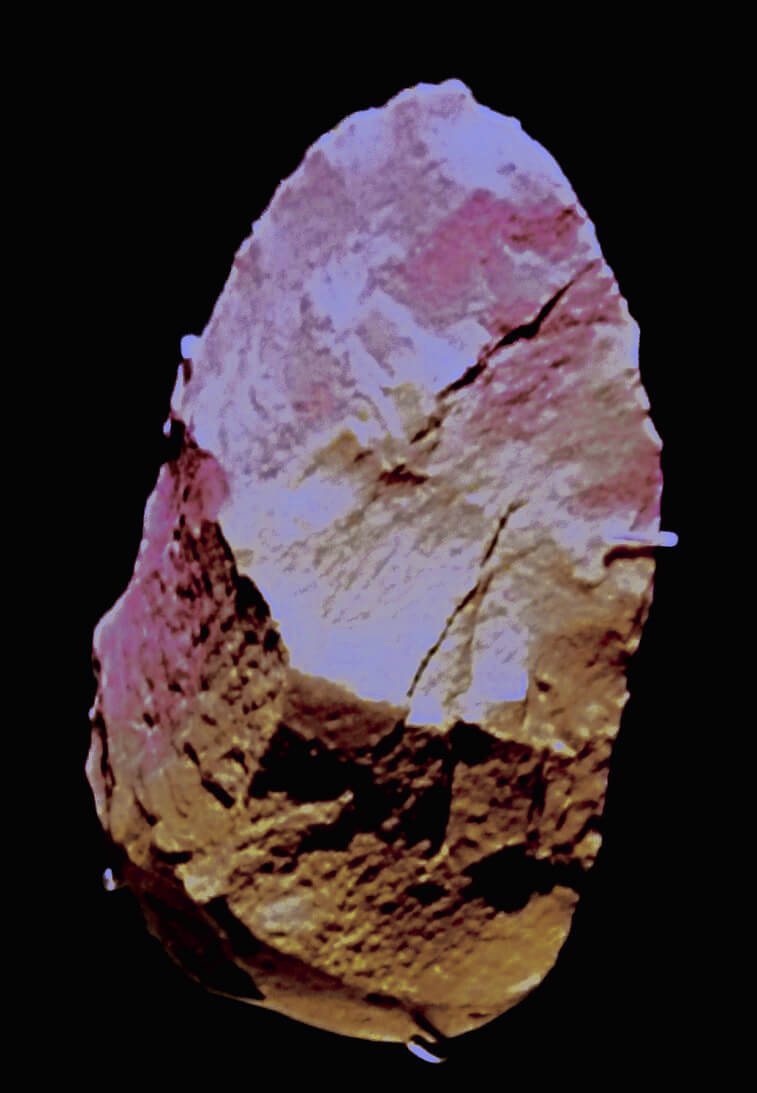
The Sima de los Huesos hand axe 15.5 cm (6 in) tall is finely crafted and made out of a rare stone, which may indicate symbolic meaning.

The discovery in 1998 of an oval hand axe of excellent workmanship in the Sima de los Huesos in the Atapuerca Mountains mixed in with the fossil remains of Homo heidelbergensis reignited this controversy. Given that this is the only lithic remnant from this section of the site (possibly a burial ground), combined with the piece's qualities led it to receive special treatment, it was even baptized Excalibur and it became a star item. Interest in the symbolic meaning of this example in particular, and hand axes in general, has multiplied in recent years, feeding both scientific and more general debate and literature.

Basch offered this counterargument:

Art is always the same, it is only possible to call someone an artist if they know how to create, within objective limits, the equivalent of the numinous complex experienced individually and expressed in a suitable manner in relation to the society in which the artist lives. In this was it is possible to distinguish an essentially artistic piece from a useful tool, although this may also be beautiful. When a prehistoric man was able to achieve the marvels that are the Acheulean axes, he did not make a work of art; nor did he make a work of art when he used his skill and experience to make a house or adapt rock shelters or caves for living or sanctuary.

— Martín Almagro

Paradoxically, within the wide range of Acheulean objects, hand axes are one of the simplest tools. They do not require as much planning as other types of object, generally made from flakes, that are less striking but more sophisticated.

Archaeologists have evidence of hand axes that are 1.2 million years old in Melka Kunturé (Ethiopia), but the oldest, from Konso-Gardula, could be 1.9 million years old: Although it is now known that they are the heritage of a number of human species, with Homo ergaster the earliest, up until 1954 no solid evidence indicated who had fabricated hand axes: in that year, in Ternifine, Algeria, Arambourg discovered remains that he called Atlanthropus, along with some hand axes. All the species associated with hand axes (from H. ergaster to H. neanderthalensis) show an advanced intelligence that in some cases is accompanied by modern features such as a relatively sophisticated technology, systems to protect against inclement weather (huts, control of fire, clothing), and certain signs of spiritual awareness (early indications of art such as adorning the body, carving of bones, ritual treatment of bodies, articulated language).

== Image gallery ==
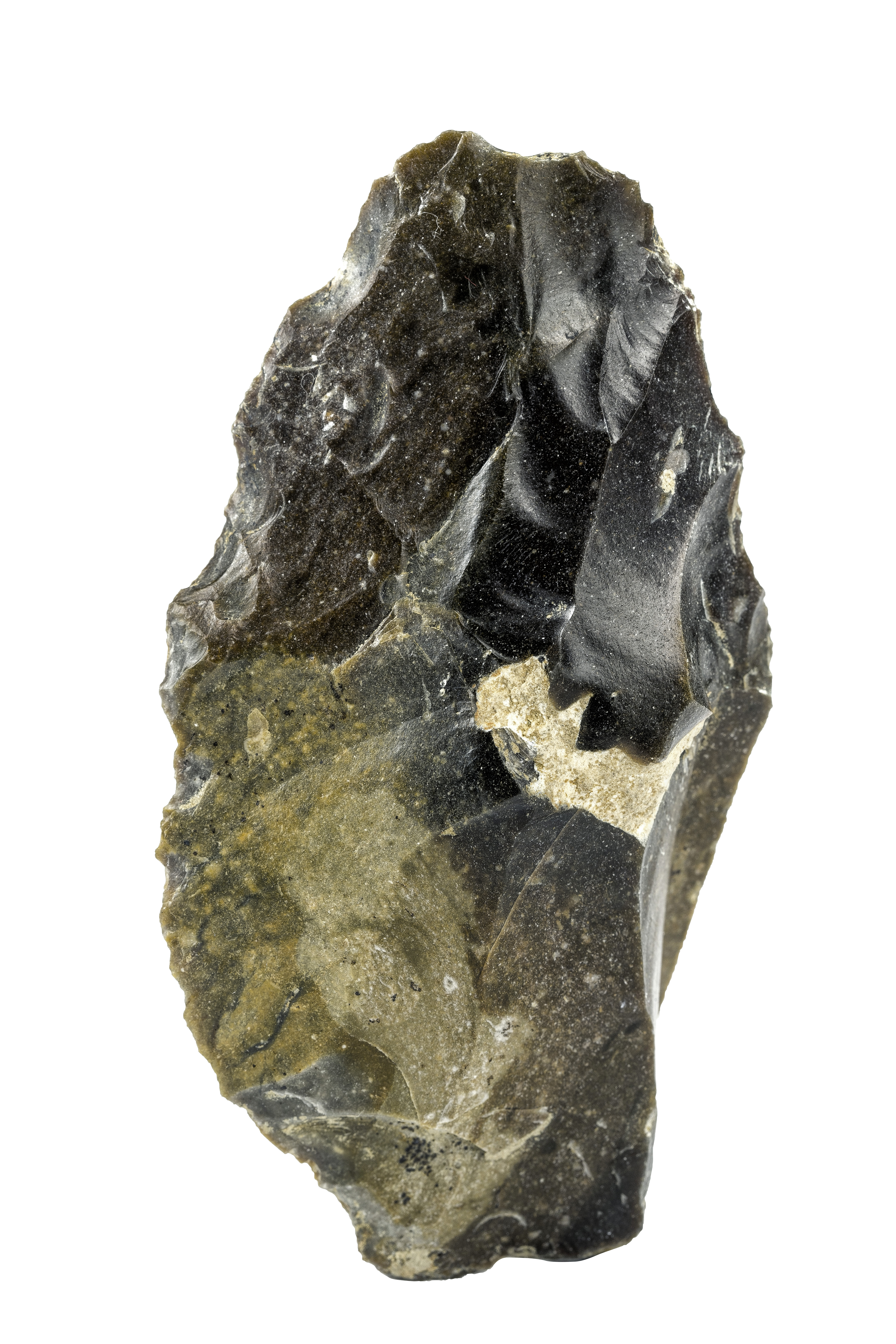
Atypical flint biface from the Lower Paleolithic Acheulean site of Kesselt (Belgium), 500,000–390,000 BP Gallo-Roman Museum (Tongeren)

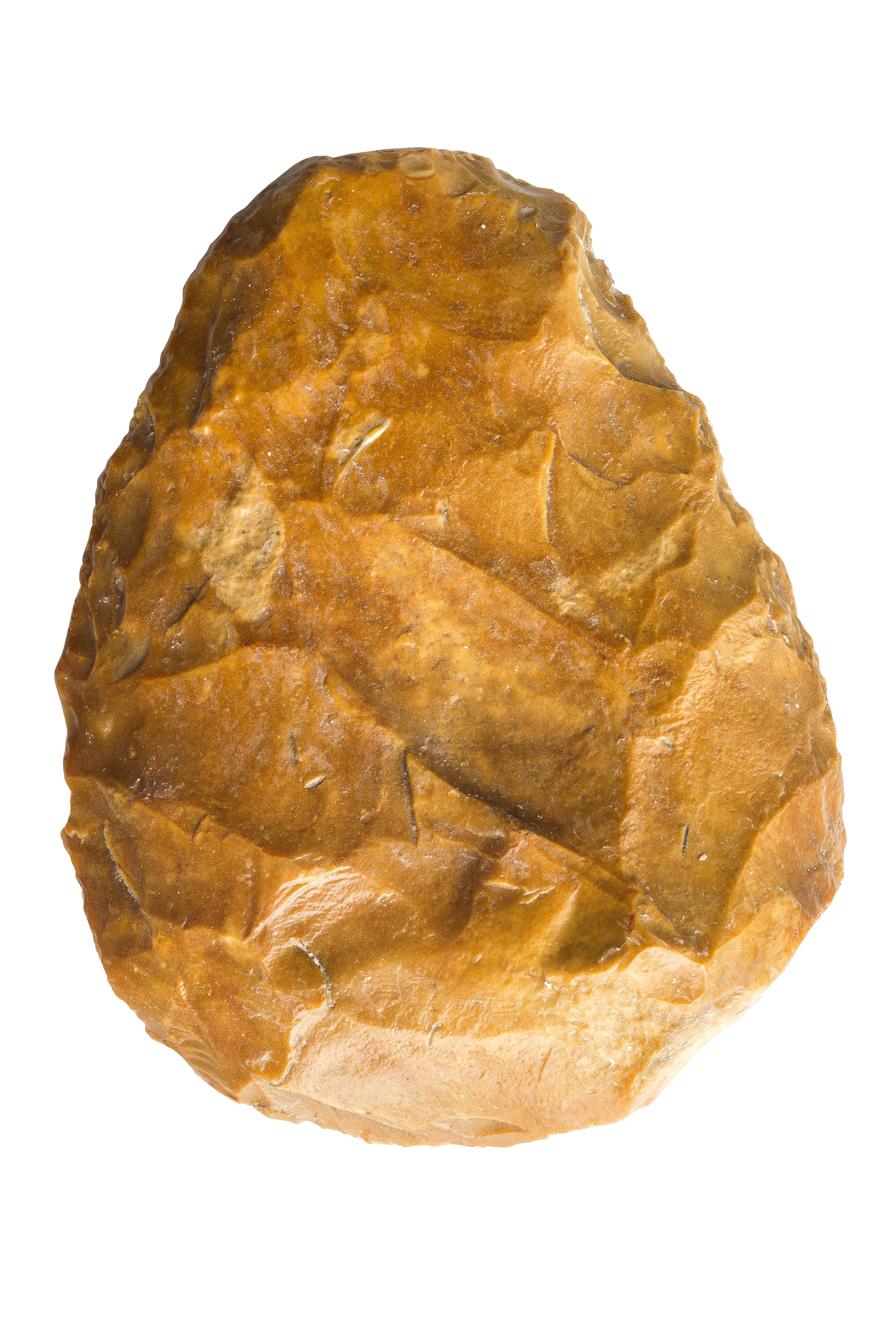
Middle Paleolithic flint biface from Meeuwen (Belgium), Gallo-Roman Museum (Tongeren)

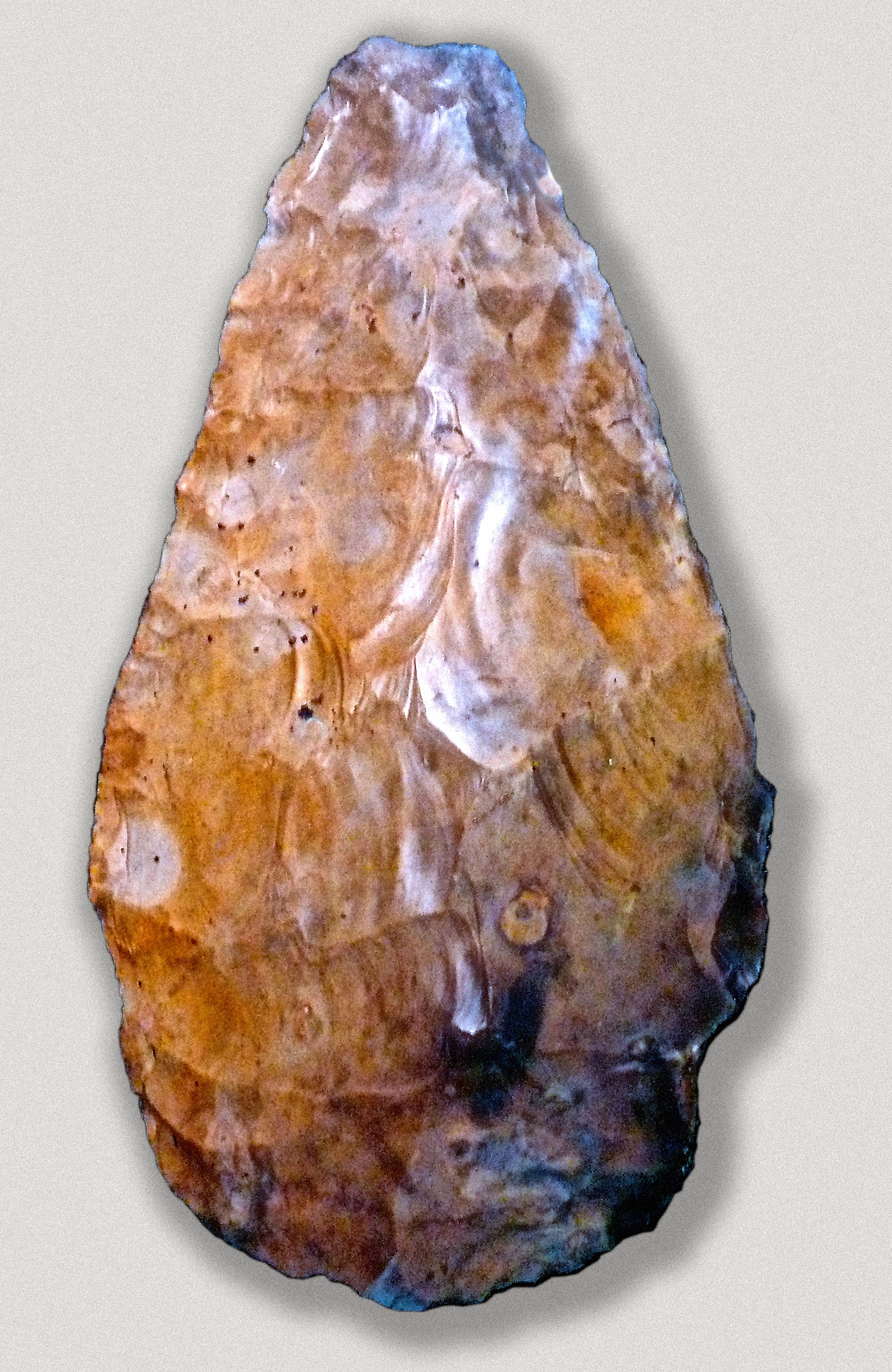
Very large hand axe from Furze Platt, Berkshire, Great Britain

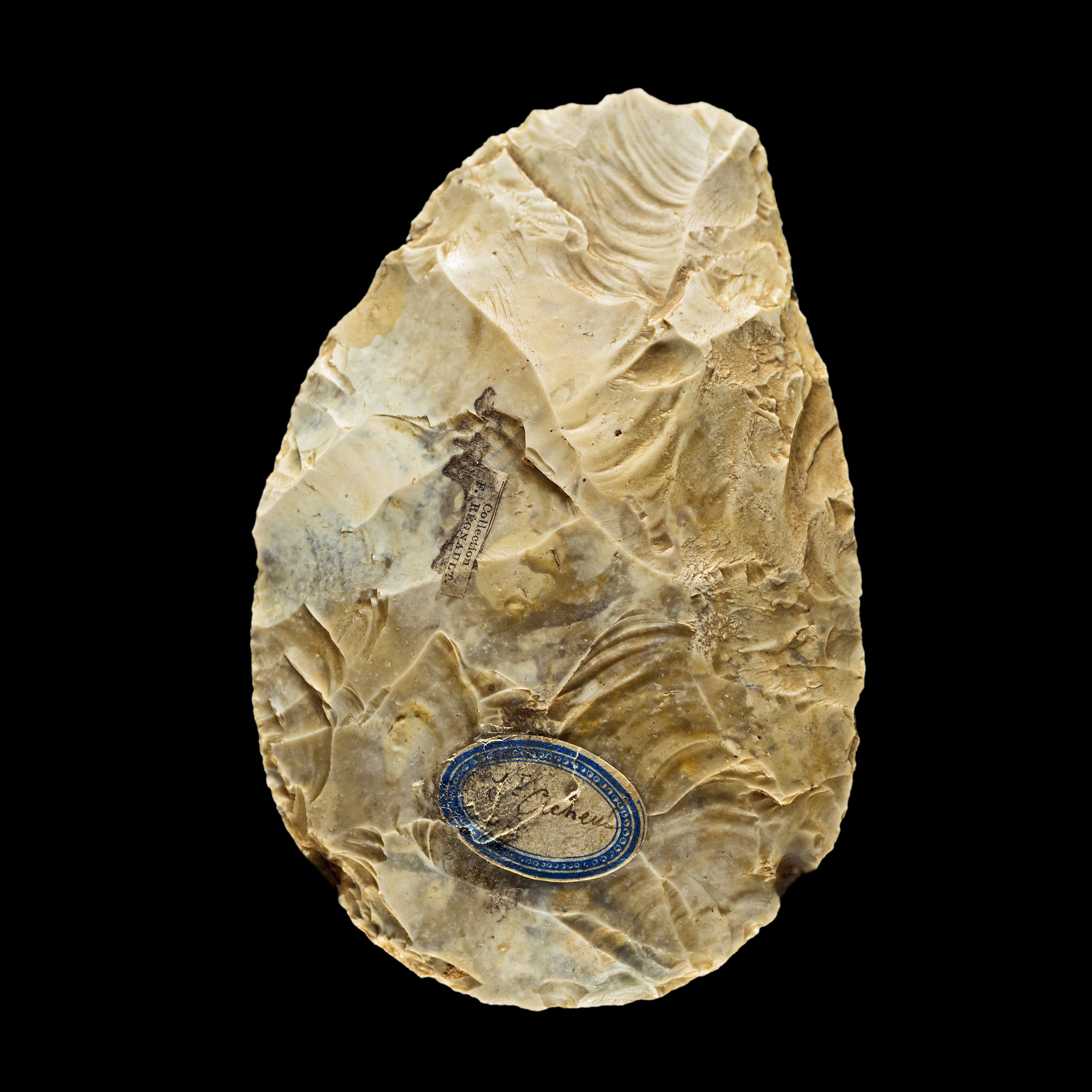
Flint biface from Saint-Acheul, France.

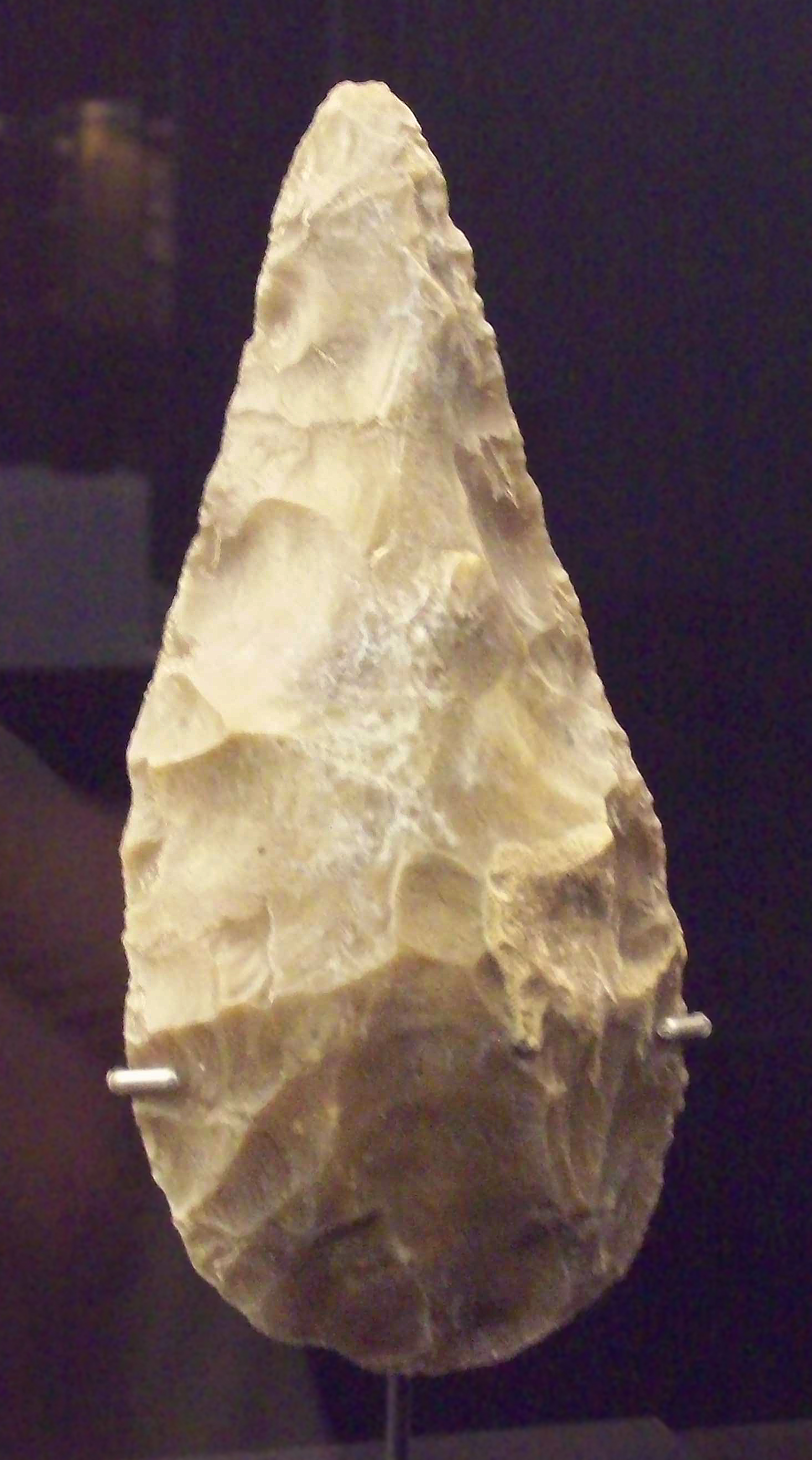
Acheulean flint biface from 200,000 years BP, found in Madrid (Spain)

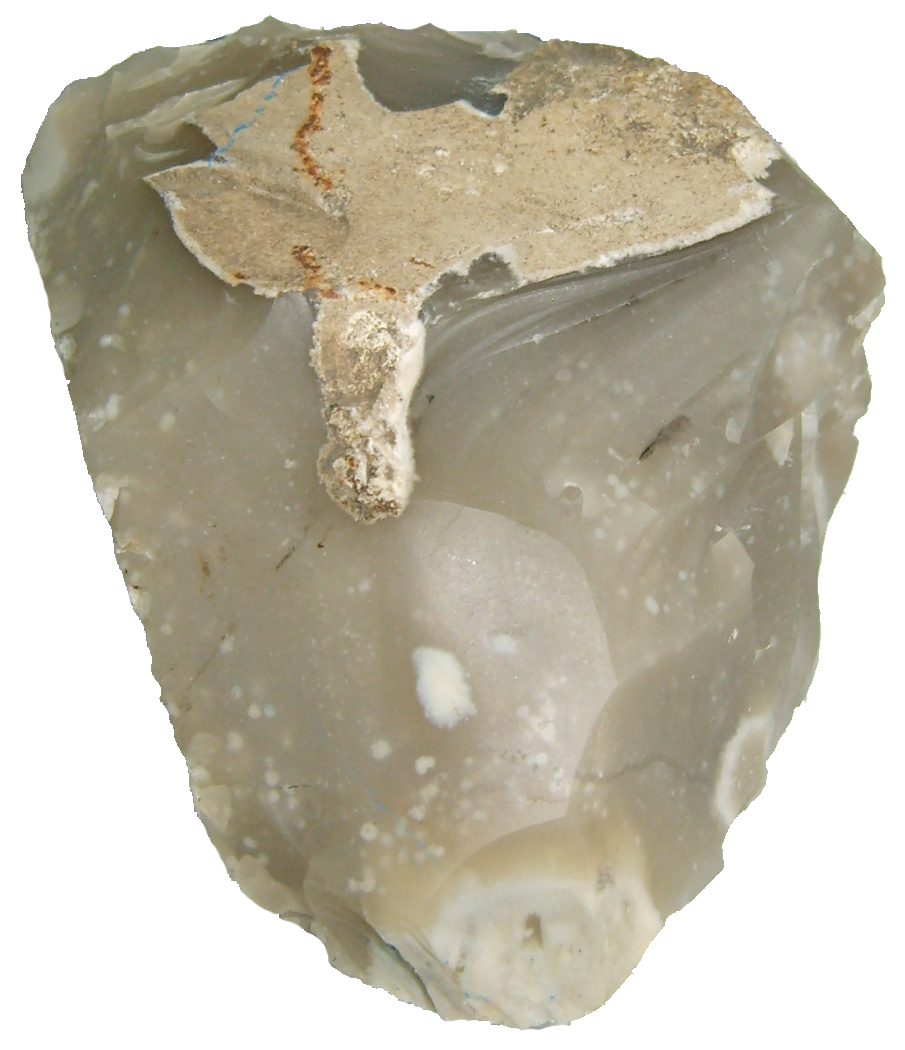
A hand axe made of Miorcani flint from the Cenomanian chalky marl layer of the Moldavian Plateau (c. 7.5 cm wide)

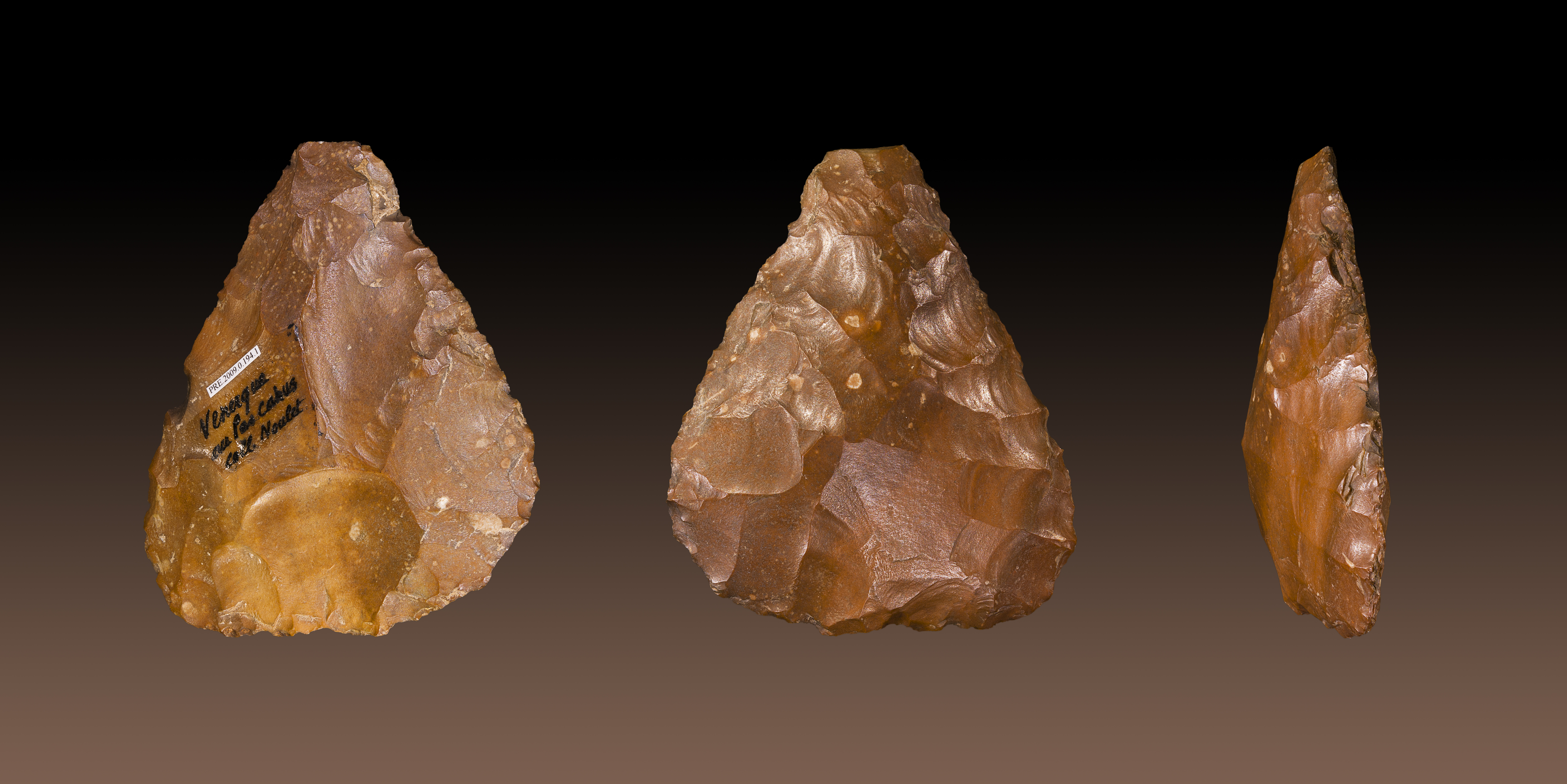
A biface found in Venerque, France

== See also ==
- Tranchet flake
- Tranchet axe

== Bibliography ==
- Boyd, Robert (2008). How Humans Evolved. New York: W. W. Norton & Company. ISBN 978-0-393-93271-3.
- Benito del Rey, Luis (1982). "Aportación a un estudio tecnomorfológico del bifaz: Studia Zamorensia". Ediciones de la Universidad de Salamanca. III. Colegio Universitario de Zamora: 305–323.
- Brézillon, Michel (1985). Dictionnaire de la Préhistoire. Librairie Larousse, Paris. ISBN 978-2-03-075437-5.
- Barnes, Alfred S.; Kidder, H.-H. (1936). "Différentes Techniques de débitage à La Ferrassie". Bulletin de la Société préhistorique de France. 33 (4): 272–288. doi:10.3406/bspf.1936.4464. JSTOR 27912598.
- Bergman, Christopher A.; Roberts, M.B. (1988). "Flaking technology at the acheulean site of Boxgrove (West Sussex, England)". Revue archéologique de Picardie. 1 (1): 105–113. doi:10.3406/pica.1988.1581.
- Bordes, François (1961). Typologie du Paléolithique ancien et moyen. Bordeaux: Impriméries Delmas.
- Bordes, F. (1948). "Les couches moustériennes du gisement du Moustier (Dordogne). Typologie et techniques de taille". Bulletin de la Société préhistorique de France. 45 (3/4): 113–125. doi:10.3406/bspf.1948.2322. JSTOR 27914295.
- Bordes, F. (1970). "Observations typologiques et techniques sur le Périgordien supérieur de Corbiac (Dordogne)". Bulletin de la Société préhistorique française. Comptes rendus des séances mensuelles. 67 (4): 105–113. doi:10.3406/bspf.1970.4234. JSTOR 27916409.
- Bordes, François (1980). "Le débitage Levallois et ses variantes". Bulletin de la Société préhistorique française. 77 (2): 45–49. doi:10.3406/bspf.1980.5242. JSTOR 27918419.
- Callow, P. (1995). "The Olduvai bifaces: technology and raw materials". In Leakey, Mary; Roe, Derek (eds.). Olduvai Gorge: Volume 5, Excavations in Beds III, IV and the Masek Beds. Cambridge University Press. pp. 235–253. ISBN 978-0-521-33403-7.
- Dibble, Harold L. (1987). "Reduction Sequences in the Manufacture of Mousterian Implements of France". The Pleistocene Old World. Interdisciplinary Contributions to Archaeology. pp. 33–45. doi:10.1007/978-1-4613-1817-0_3. ISBN 978-1-4612-9016-2.
- Fish, Paul R. (1981). "Beyond Tools: Middle Paleolithic Debitage Analysis and Cultural Inference". Journal of Anthropological Research. 37 (4): 374–386. doi:10.1086/jar.37.4.3629834. JSTOR 3629834. S2CID 163270598.
- F. Knowles, Stone-Worker's Progress (Oxford 1953).
- Kohn, Marek; Mithen, Steven (September 1999). "Handaxes: products of sexual selection?". Antiquity. 73 (281): 518–526. doi:10.1017/S0003598X00065078. S2CID 162903453. Gale A57049967.
- Kuman, K (1996). "The Oldowan Industry from Sterkfontein: raw materials and core forms". Aspects of African Archaeology: Papers from the 10th Congress of the PanAfrican Association for Prehistory and Related Studies. University of Zimbabwe Publications. pp. 139–146. ISBN 978-0-908307-55-5.
- J. M. Merino, Tipología lítica. Editorial Munibe 1994. Suplemento, (San Sebastián 1994). ISSN 1698-3807.
- H. Müller-Beck, Zur Morphologie altpaläolithischer Steingeräte. Ethnogr.-Archäol.-Zeitschr. 24, 1983, 401–433.
- Newcomer, M. H. (June 1971). "Some quantitative experiments in handaxe manufacture". World Archaeology. 3 (1): 85–94. doi:10.1080/00438243.1971.9979493.
- Weber, T (1987). "Die Steinartefakte des Homo erectus von Bilzingsleben". Ethnographisch-archaologische Zeitschrift. 28 (1): 136–146. INIST 8244294.
