= Adze =

Woodworking tool with the cutting edge perpendicular to the handle

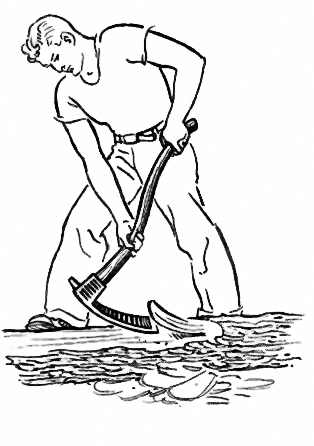
Adze

An adze (/ædz/) or adz is an ancient and versatile cutting tool similar to an axe but with the cutting edge perpendicular to the handle rather than parallel. Adzes have been used since the Stone Age. They are used for smoothing or carving wood in hand woodworking, and as a hoe for agriculture and horticulture. Two basic forms of an adze are the hand adze (short hoe)—a short-handled tool swung with one hand—and the foot adze (hoe)—a long-handled tool capable of powerful swings using both hands, the cutting edge usually striking at foot or shin level. A similar tool is called a mattock, which differs by having two blades, one perpendicular to the handle and one parallel.

== History ==
=== Africa ===
The adze is depicted in ancient Egyptian art from the Old Kingdom onward. Originally the adze blades were made of stone, but already in the Predynastic Period copper adzes had all but replaced those made of flint. Stone blades were fastened to the handle by tying and early bronze blades continued this simple construction. It was not until the later Bronze Age that the handle passes through an eye at the top of the blade. Examples of Egyptian adzes can be found in museums and on the Petrie Museum website.

U21
Adze-on-Block
in hieroglyphs

A depiction of an adze was also used as a hieroglyph, representing the consonants stp, "chosen", and used as: ...Pharaoh XX, chosen of God/Goddess YY...

The ahnetjer (Manuel de Codage transliteration: aH-nTr) depicted as an adze-like instrument, was used in the opening of the mouth ceremony, intended to convey power over their senses to statues and mummies. It was apparently the foreleg of a freshly sacrificed bull or cow with which the mouth was touched.

As Iron Age technology moved south into Africa with migrating ancient Egyptians, they carried their technology with them, including adzes. To this day, iron adzes are used all over rural Africa for various purposes—from digging pit latrines, and chopping firewood, to tilling crop fields—whether they are of maize (corn), coffee, tea, pyrethrum, beans, millet, yams, or a plethora of other cash and subsistence crops.

=== South Pacific ===
Prehistoric Māori adzes from New Zealand were for wood carving, typically made from pounamu sourced from the South Island. During the Māori Archaic period found on the North Island were commonly made from greywacke from Motutapu Island or basalt from Opito Bay in the Coromandel, similar to adzes constructed on other Pacific Islands. Early period notched adzes found in Northland were primarily made of argillite quarried from locations around the Marlborough and Nelson regions. At the same time on Henderson Island, a small coral island in eastern Polynesia lacking any rock other than limestone, native populations may have fashioned giant clamshells into adzes.

=== Northwest Coastal America ===
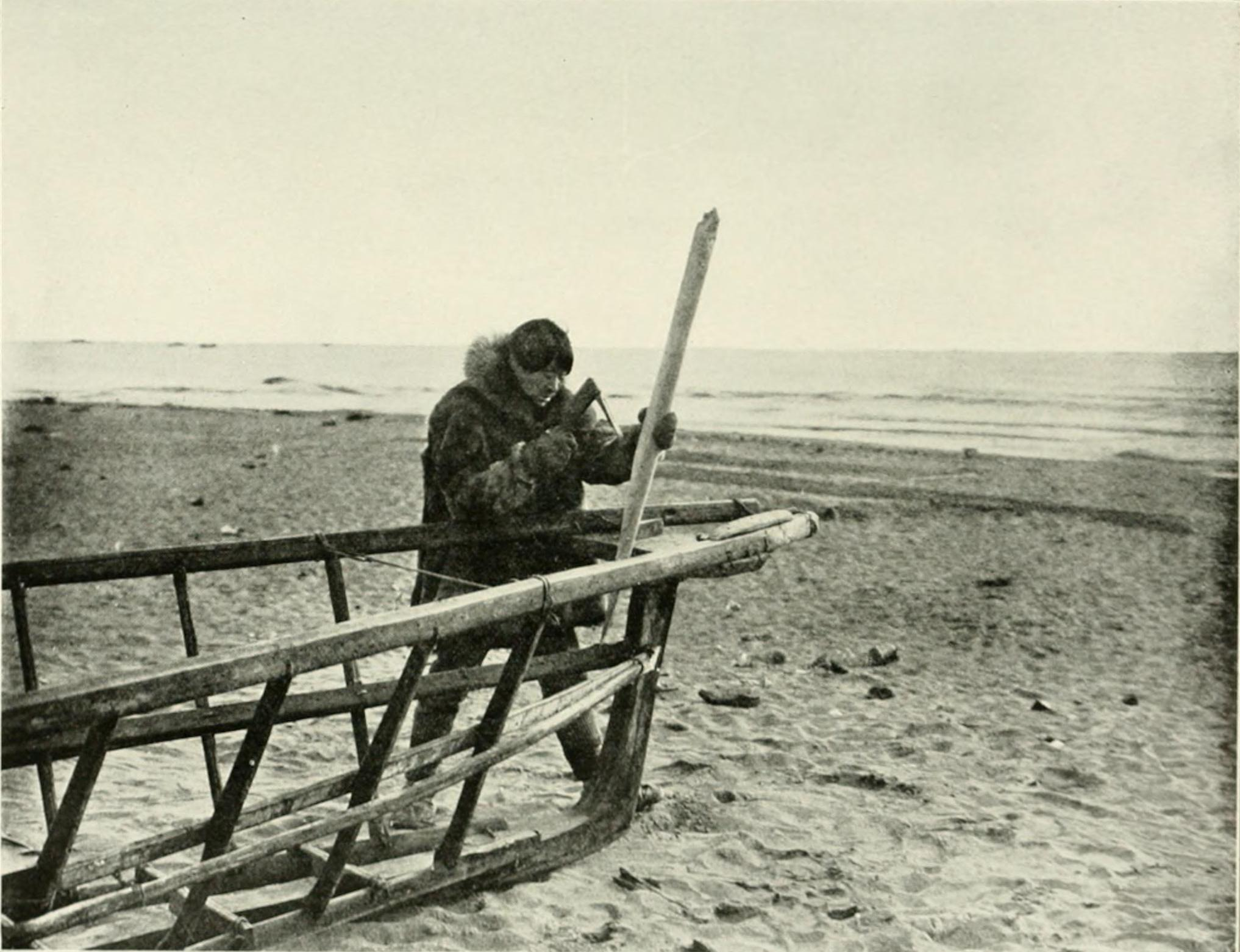
Native Alaskan boat builder using an adze c. 1910

American Northwest coast native peoples traditionally used adzes for both functional construction (from bowls to canoes) and art (from masks to totem poles). Northwest coast adzes take two forms: hafted and D-handle. The hafted form is similar in form to a European adze with the haft constructed from a natural crooked branch which approximately forms a 60% angle. The thin end is used as the handle and the thick end is flattened and notched such that an adze iron can be lashed to it. Modern hafts are sometimes constructed from a sawed blank with a dowel added for strength at the crook. The second form is the D-handle adze which is basically an adze iron with a directly attached handle. The D-handle, therefore, provides no mechanical leverage. Northwest coast adzes are often classified by size and iron shape vs. role. As with European adzes, iron shapes include straight, gutter and lipped. Where larger Northwest adzes are similar in size to their European counterparts, the smaller sizes are typically much lighter such that they can be used for the detailed smoothing, shaping and surface texturing required for figure carving. Final surfacing is sometimes performed with a crooked knife.

=== New Guinea and Melanesia ===
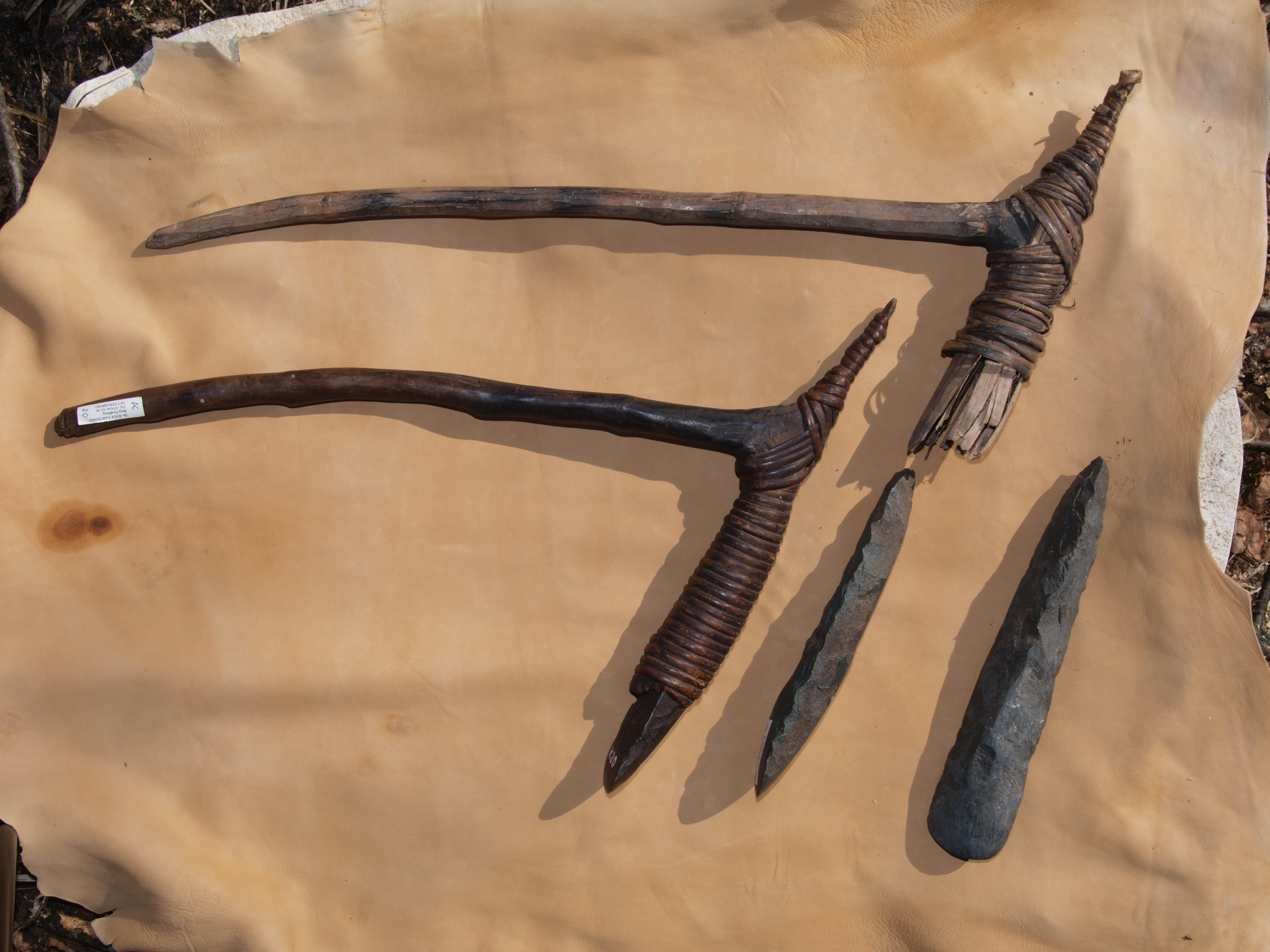
Contemporary stone adzes from New Guinea

Ground stone adzes used to be produced by a variety of people in Western New Guinea (Indonesia), Papua New Guinea and some of the smaller Islands of Melanesia and Micronesia. The hardstone would have been ground on a riverine rock with the help of water until the desired shape was obtained. It was then fixed to a natural grown angled wood with resin and plant fibers. A variety of minerals were used. Imported steel axes or machetes have now entirely replaced these tools for decades in even the remotest parts of New Guinea. Indeed, even before the first foreign missionaries or colonial officials arrived in the New Guinea Highlands, inhabitants had already obtained steel tools through trade with their neighbors. Stone tools are sometimes manufactured to be sold as curios to tourists.

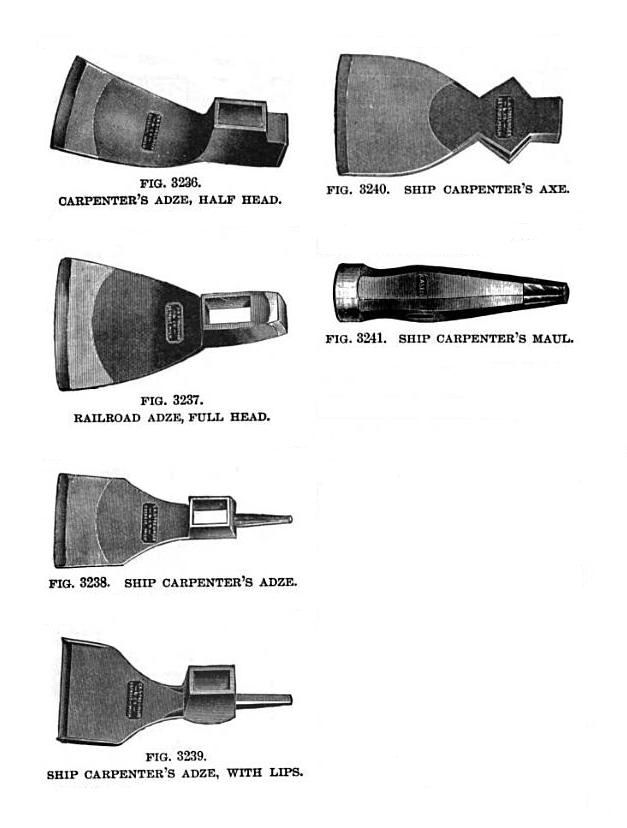
19th-century catalogue showing various adze and axe heads

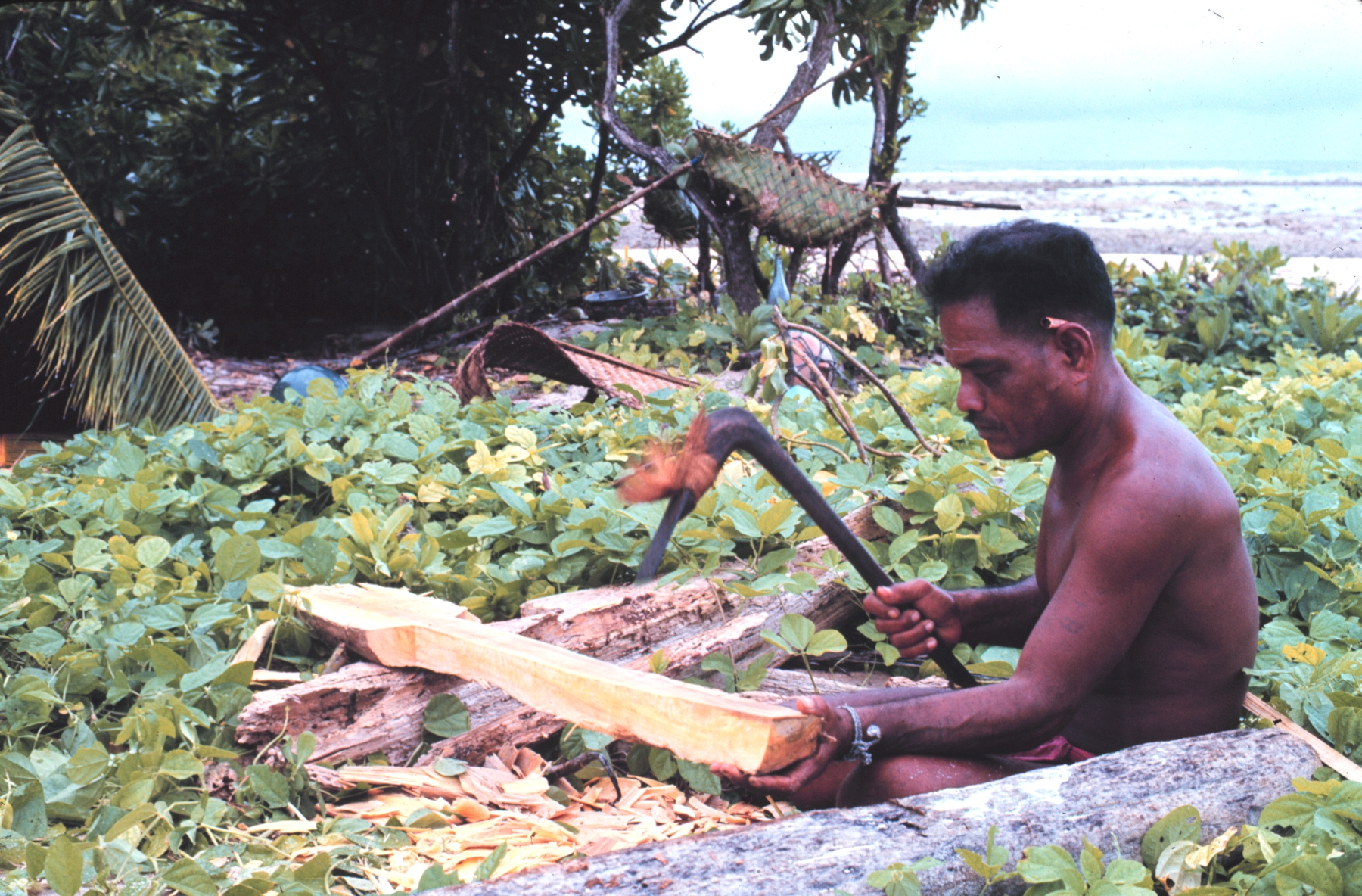
Micronesian of Tobi, Palau, making a paddle for his wa with an adze

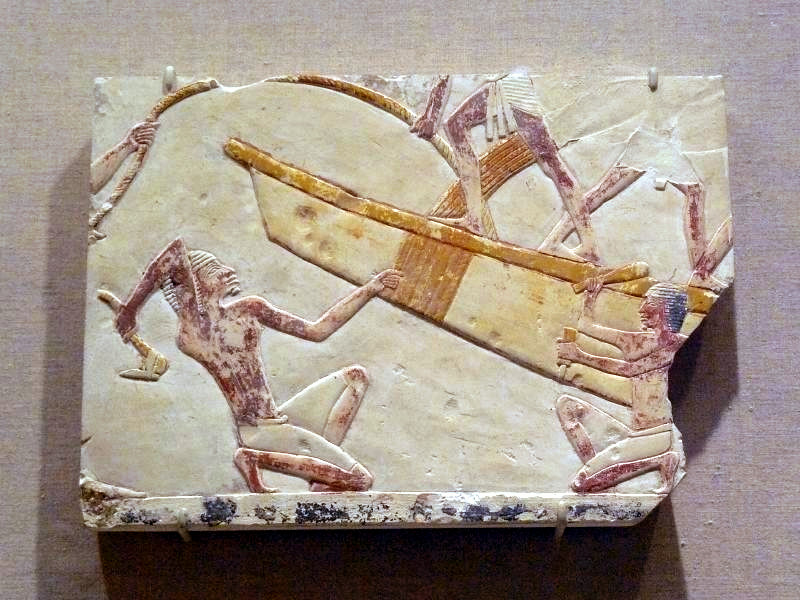
Egyptian boatbuilding relief, featuring a workman using an adze

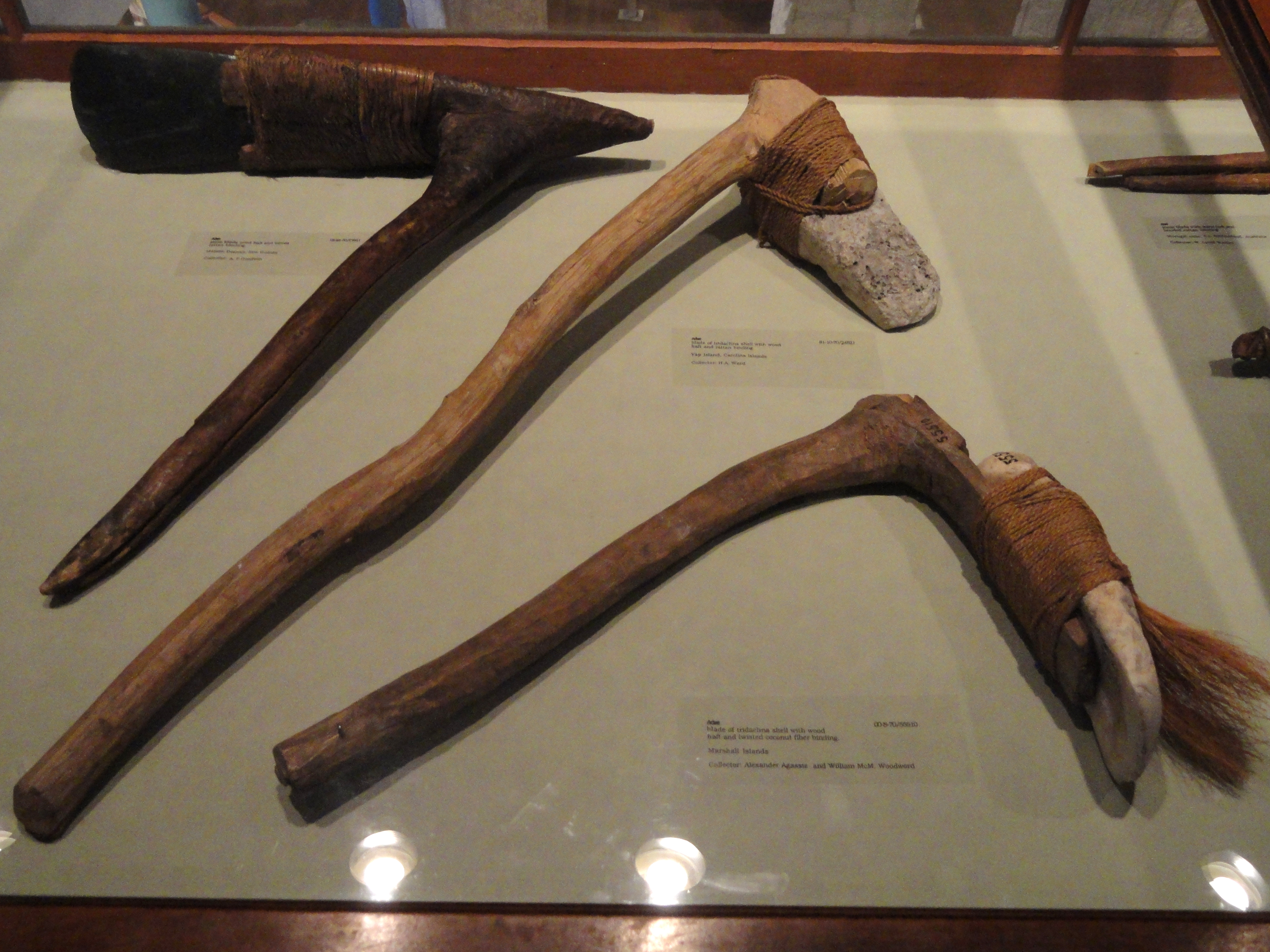
Adzes, Marshall and Yap Islands – Pacific collection – Peabody Museum, Harvard University

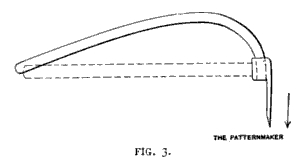
Japanese adze

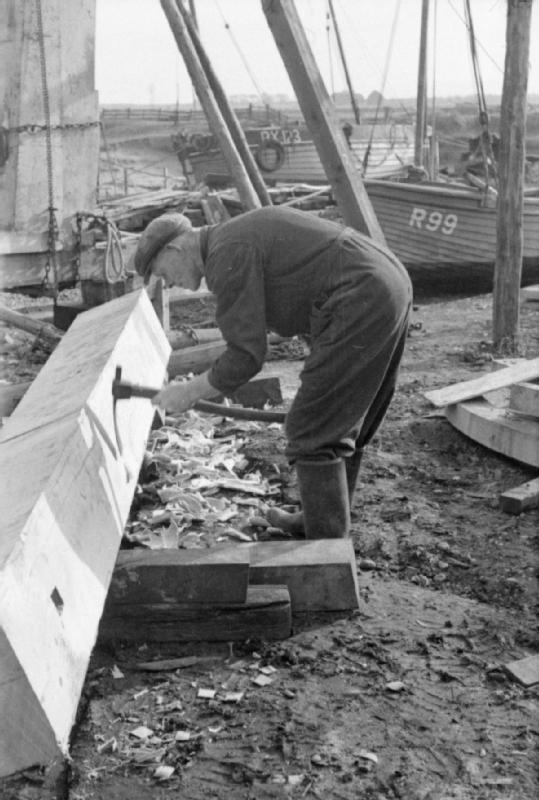
Rye Shipyard – the construction of motor fishing vessels, Rye, Sussex, England, UK, 1944

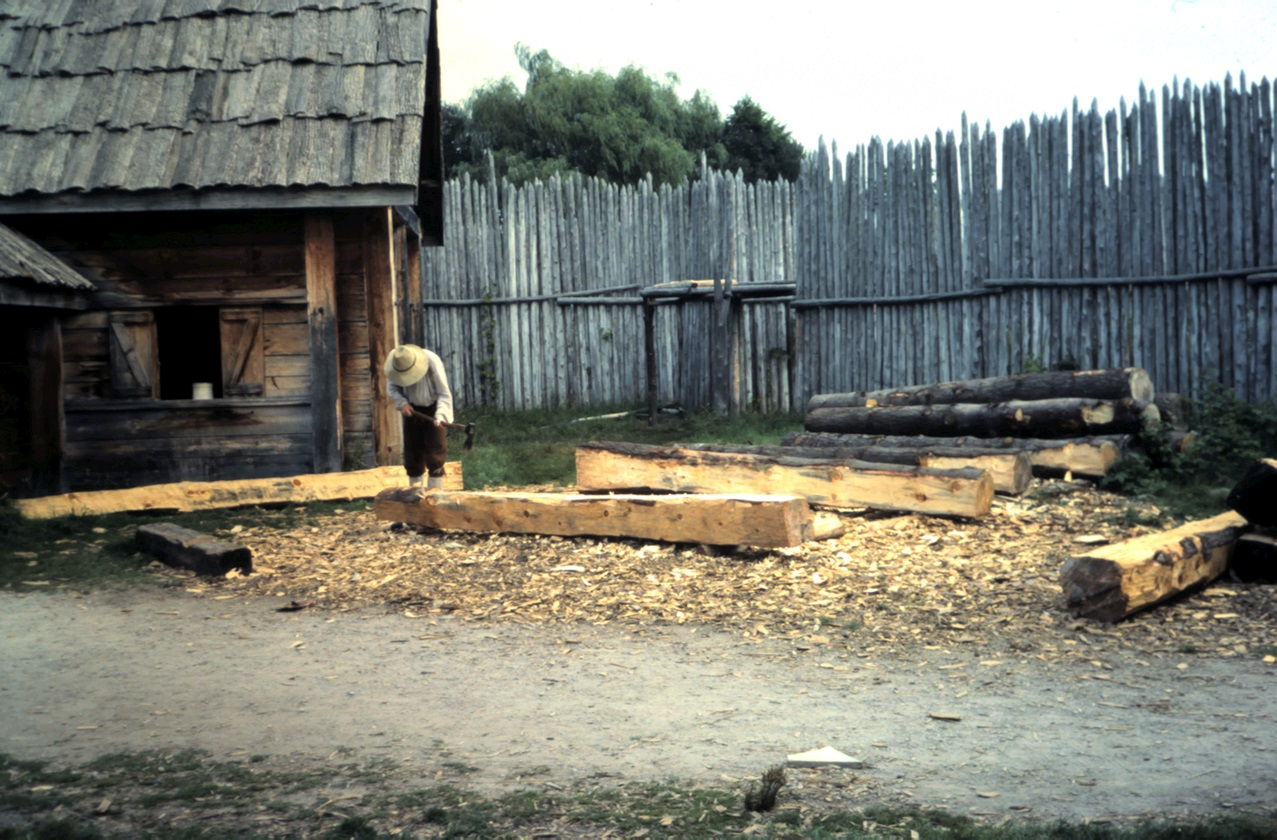
A craftsman uses an adze to square beams, and to recreate 17th-century colonial life

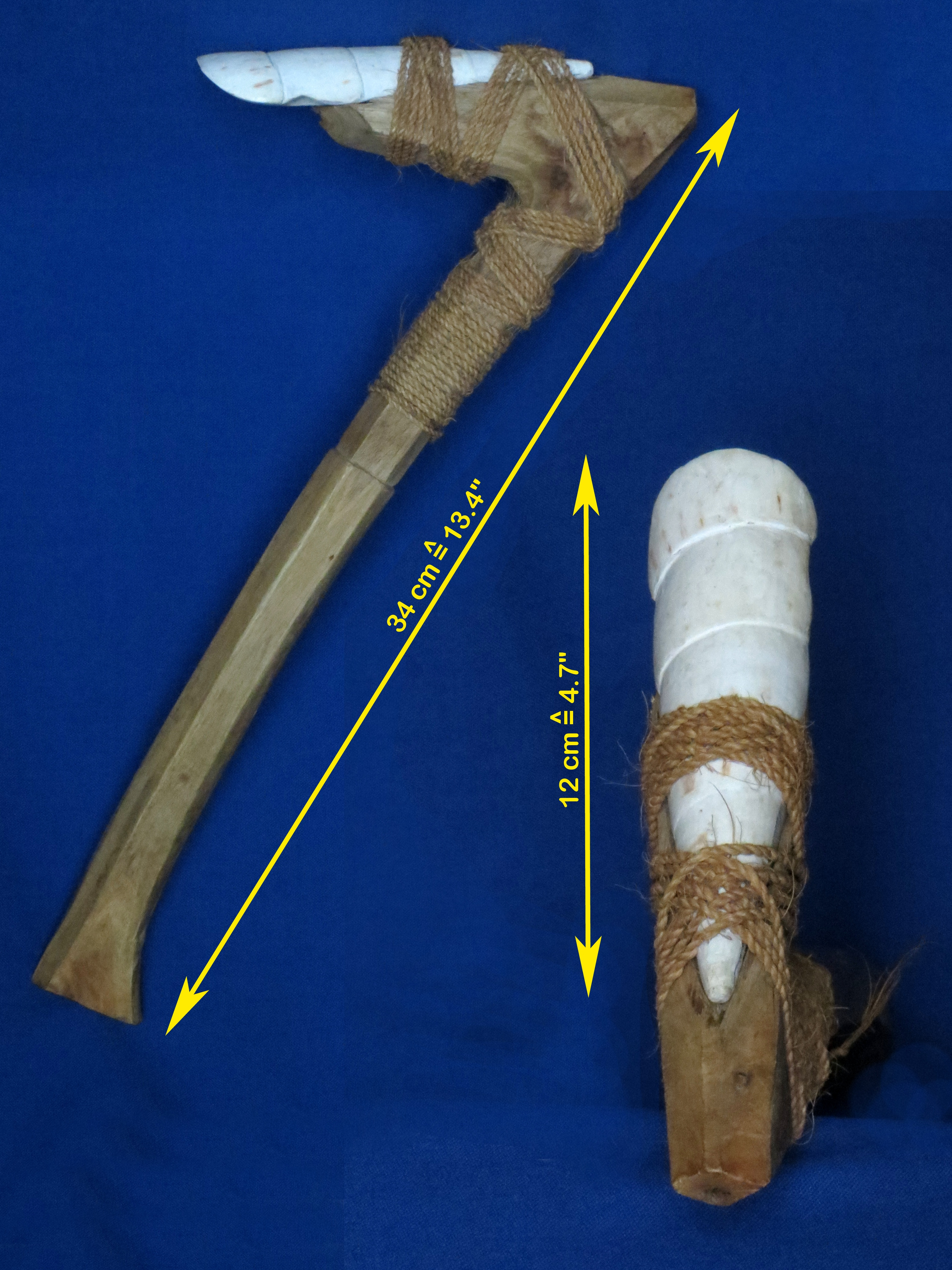
Polynesian adze (replica), bought 2019 in Yap

== Modern adzes ==
Modern adzes are made from steel with wooden handles, and enjoy limited use: occasionally in semi-industrial areas, but particularly by "revivalists" such as those at the Colonial Williamsburg cultural center in Virginia, United States. However, the traditional adze has largely been replaced by the sawmill and the powered plane, at least in industrialised cultures. It remains in use for some specialist crafts, for example by coopers. Adzes are also in current use by artists such as Northwest Coast American and Canadian Indigenous sculptors doing totem pole carving, as well as masks and bowls.

=== Foot adze ===
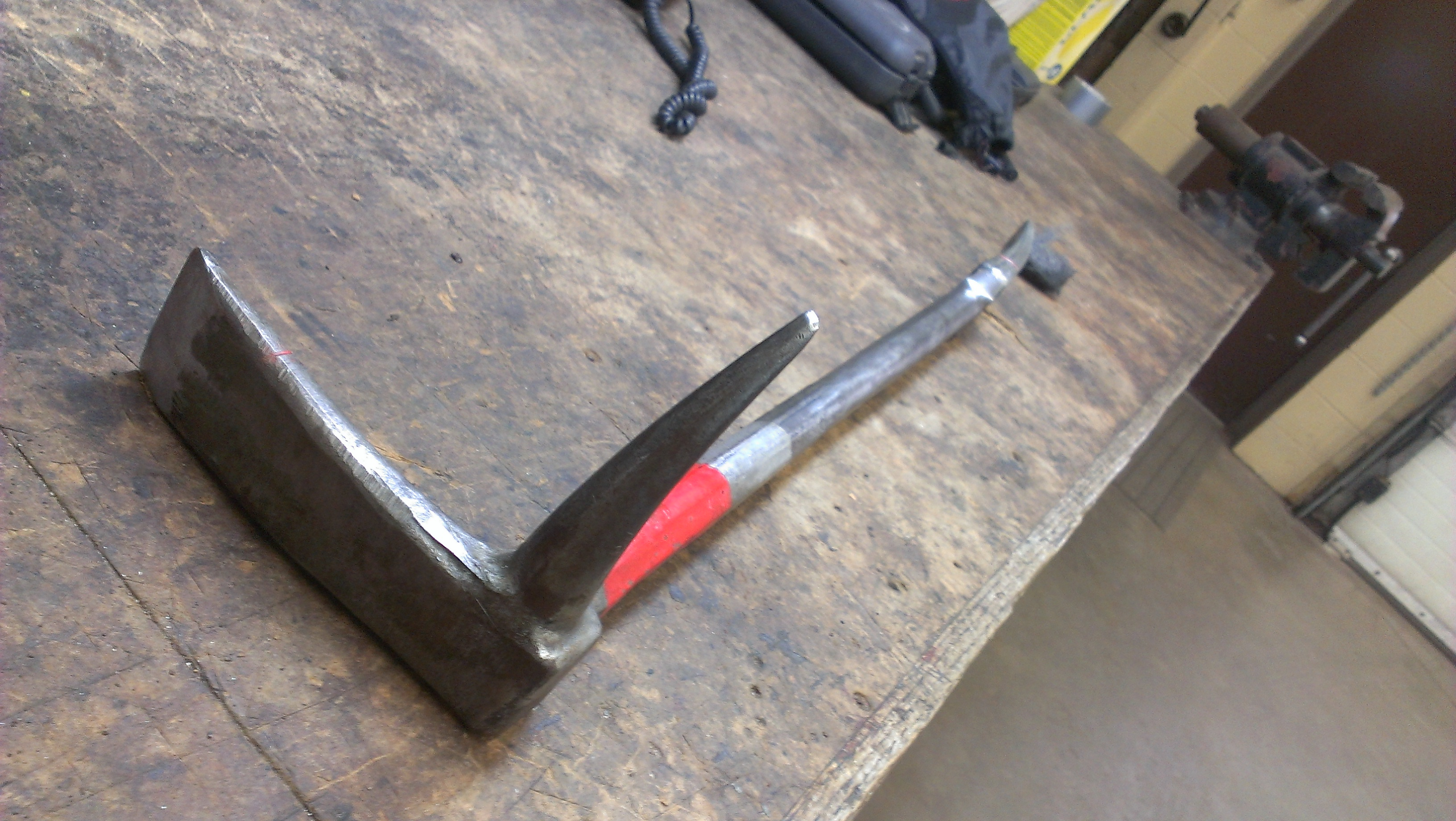
A Halligan bar, showing the adze (left) and pickaxe heads on the end of the bar

"Adzes are used for removing heavy waste, leveling, shaping, or trimming the surfaces of timber" and boards. Generally, the user stands astride a board or log and swings the adze downwards between his feet, chipping off pieces of wood, moving backwards as they go and leaving a relatively smooth surface behind.

Foot adzes are most commonly known as shipbuilder's or carpenter's adzes. They range in size from 00 to 5 being 3 1/4 to 4 3/4 pounds (1.5–2.2 kg) with the cutting edge 3 to 4 1/2 inches (75–115 mm) wide. On the modern, steel adze the cutting edge may be flat for smoothing work to very rounded for hollowing work such as bowls, gutters and canoes. The shoulders or sides of an adze may be curved called a lipped adze, used for notching. The end away from the cutting edge is called the pole and be of different shapes, generally flat or a pin pole.

- Carpenter's adze – A heavy adze, often with very steep curves, and a very heavy, blunt pole. The weight of this adze makes it unsuitable for sustained overhead adzing.
  - Railroad adze – A carpenter's adze which had its bit extended in an effort to limit the breaking of handles when shaping railroad ties (railway sleepers). Early examples in New England began showing up approximately in the 1840s–1850s. The initial prototypes clearly showed a weld where the extension was attached.
- Shipwright's adze – A lighter, and more versatile adze than the carpenter's adze. This was designed to be used in a variety of positions, including overhead, as well as in front on waist and chest level.
  - Lipped shipwright's adze – A variation of the shipwright's adze. It features a wider than normal bit, whose outside edges are sharply turned up, so that when gazing directly down the adze, from bit to eye, the cutting edge resembles an extremely wide and often very flat U. This adze was mainly used for shaping cross grain, such as for joining planks.
- Another group of adzes can be differentiated by the handles; the D-handled adzes have a handle where the hand can be wrapped around the D, close to the bit. These adzes closely follow traditional forms in that the bit or tooth is not wrapped around the handle as a head.
- The head of an ice axe typically possesses an adze for chopping rough steps in ice.
- A firefighter tool called the Halligan bar has a dull adze on one end of the bar. This bar is a multipurpose tool for forcible entry of a structure and demolition with a forked pry-bar on one end and an adze and spike on the other, called the adze-end.
- Demolition adze – A demolition adze has a dull edge and is used for separating materials in the demolition or salvage of old buildings.

=== Hand adze ===
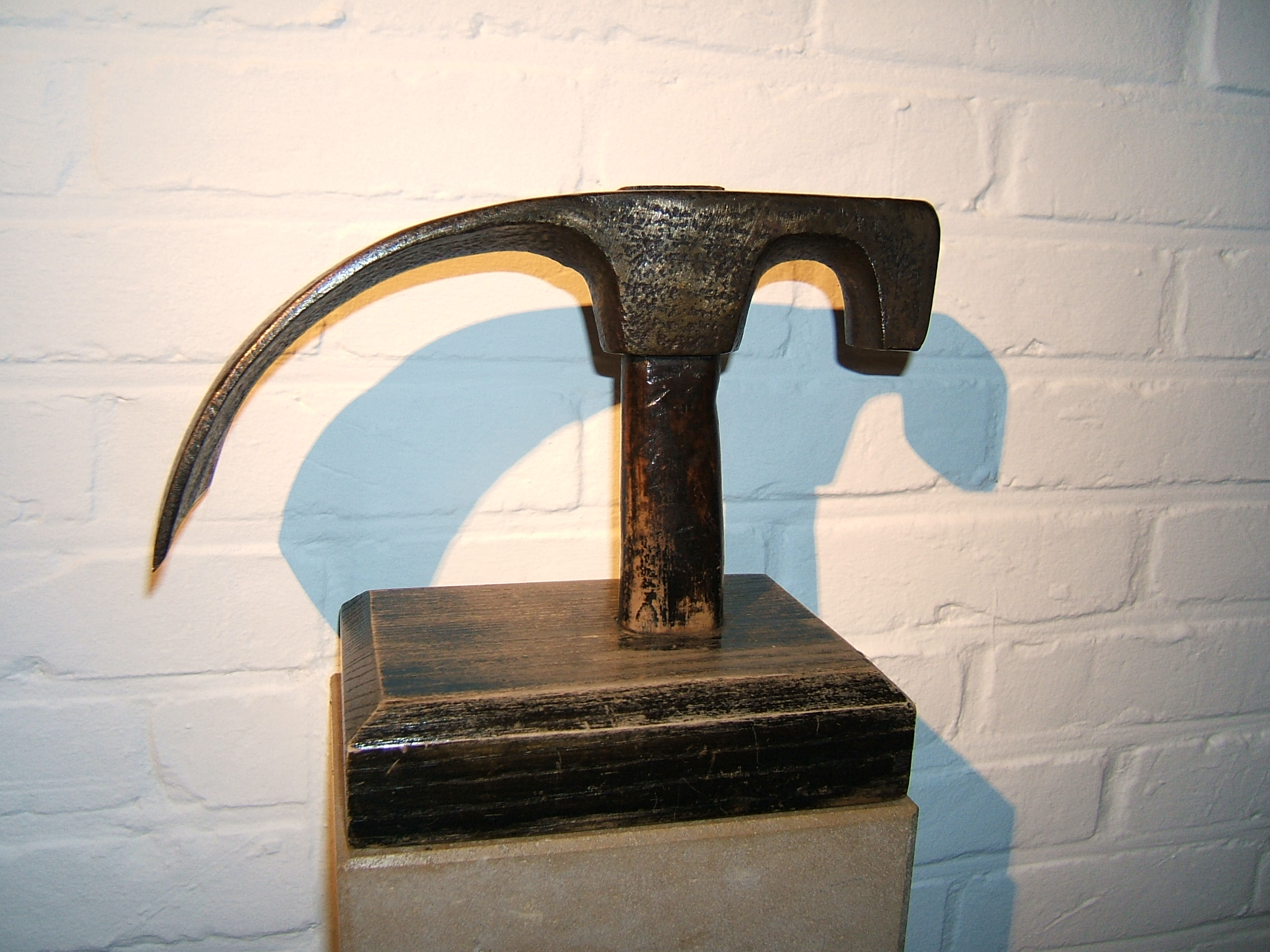
Cooper's adze

There are a number of specialist, short-handled adzes used by coopers, wainwrights, and chair makers, and in bowl and trough making. Many of these have shorter handles for control and more curve in the head to allow better clearance for shorter cuts.

=== Bulgarian adze ===
A common tool used throughout Europe is the tesla (Serbo-Croatian) or keser (Turkish), sometimes called a Bulgarian adze. It has a sharpened edge perpendicular to the handle, resembling an adze, but it is also used like a carpenter's hammer. On the back of the head is a textured poll for driving nails, and on the front is a V-shaped hole used for prying, to extract the bent nails.

There is a popular Bulgarian folk song called "На теслата дръжката" (Eng: The tesla's handle) about a craftsman and the masculinity of his tool.

=== Mattock and pulaski ===
A mattock is a type of hand-tool with a long history, today mostly found as a gardening tool. It usually features a long wooden handle with a two-sided steel head, one side being a small axehead or pick, and the other being an adze. This tool is sometimes colloquially known simply as an adze.

A similar tool, the pulaski, is used by fire fighters. This tool has a larger axehead and a smaller adze on its head.

== See also ==
- Adze-on-block (hieroglyph)
- Mauna Kea Adz Quarry, used by prehistoric Hawaiians to obtain basalt stone for adzes and other tools
- Tranchet axe
