= Night (hieroglyph) =

Egyptian hieroglyph

N3
Night
Nightfall
in hieroglyphs

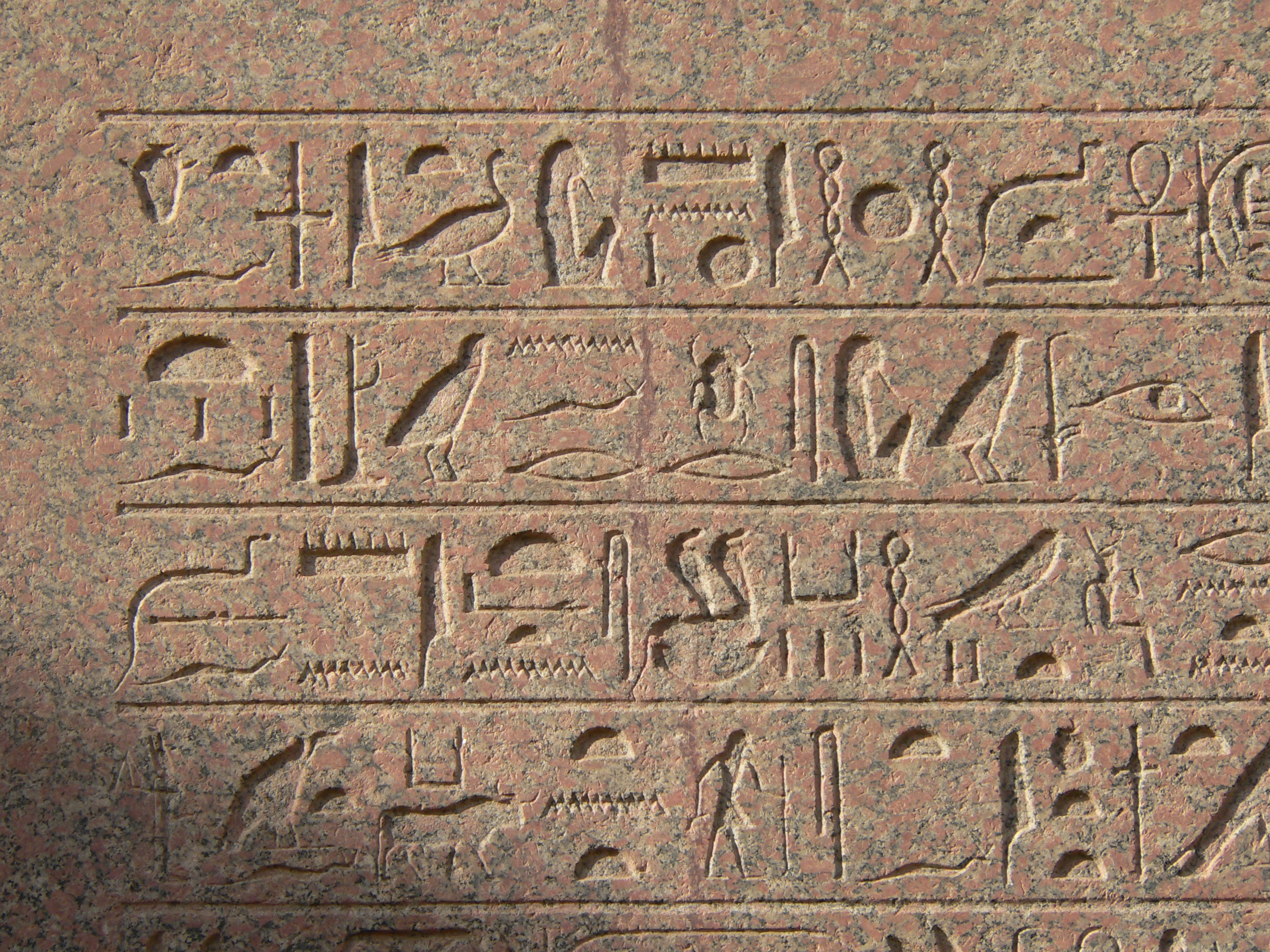
(Example hieroglyph relief).

The ancient Egyptian Night hieroglyph, Gardiner sign listed nos. N3 is a portrayal of the sky with the 'was' scepter hanging from it; it is in the Gardiner subset for "sky, earth, and water".

In the Egyptian language, the night hieroglyph is used as a determinative for words relating to 'obscurity'. In the language it is used for grh-(grḥ), and w(kh)-(uḫ) for night, and kkw-(kku) for dark, and a determinative for other related words.

Preceded by T19 (="bones") (=ancestry") 'harpoon' gen(t)	N3 night grh-(grḥ) w(kh)-(uḫ)	Succeeded by U17 pick (hieroglyph) grg

== See also ==
- Sky (hieroglyph)
- Gardiner's Sign List#N. Sky, Earth, and Water
- List of Egyptian hieroglyphs
