= Tranchet axe =

Type of edged stone tool

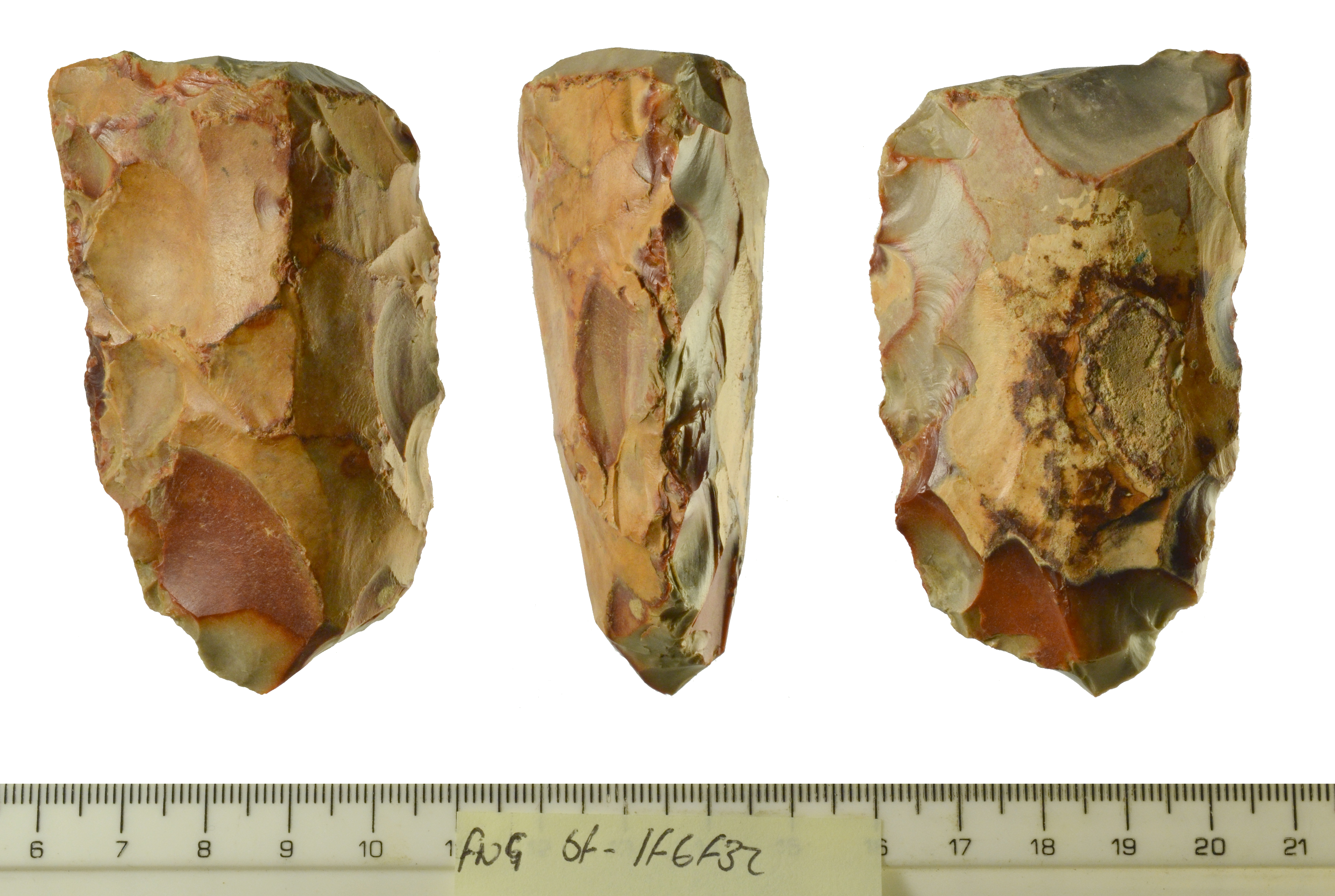
Tranchet axe found in the county of Suffolk, UK

A tranchet axe is a lithic tool made by removing a flake, known as a tranchet flake, from a larger stone. The flake is removed parallel to the final intended cutting edge of the tool which creates a single straight and sharp cutting edge as wide as the tool itself. The blade can be easily resharpened by detaching a new tranchet flake.

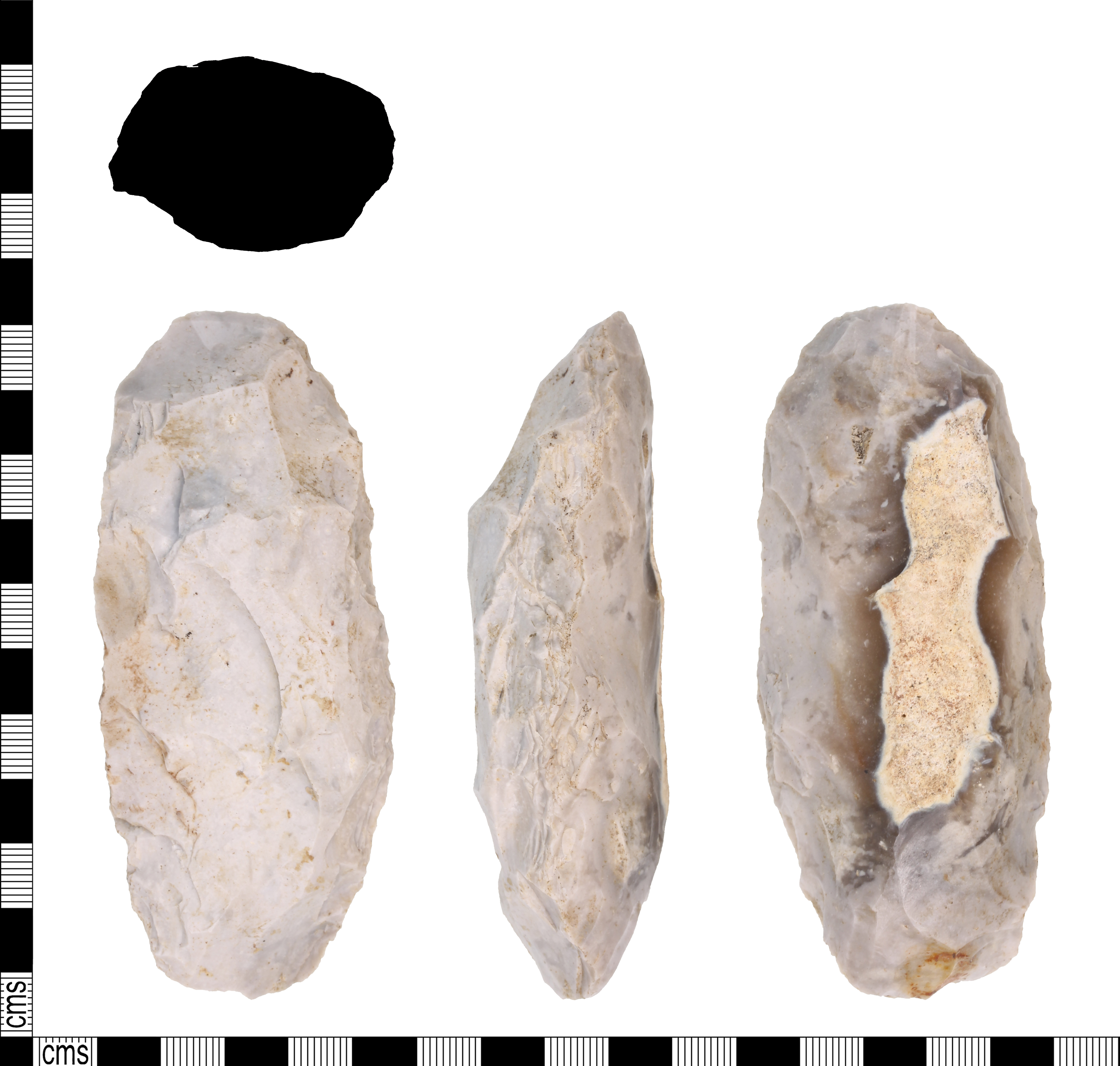
Mesolithic tranchet axe found in the county of Dorset, UK

This stone working technique represents an important step in the evolution of lithic technology, as it bridged the gap between the more rudimentary Paleolithic tools and the relatively polished tools of the Neolithic. At certain European excavation sites, the discovery of tranchet axeheads is regarded as an early Mesolithic marker.

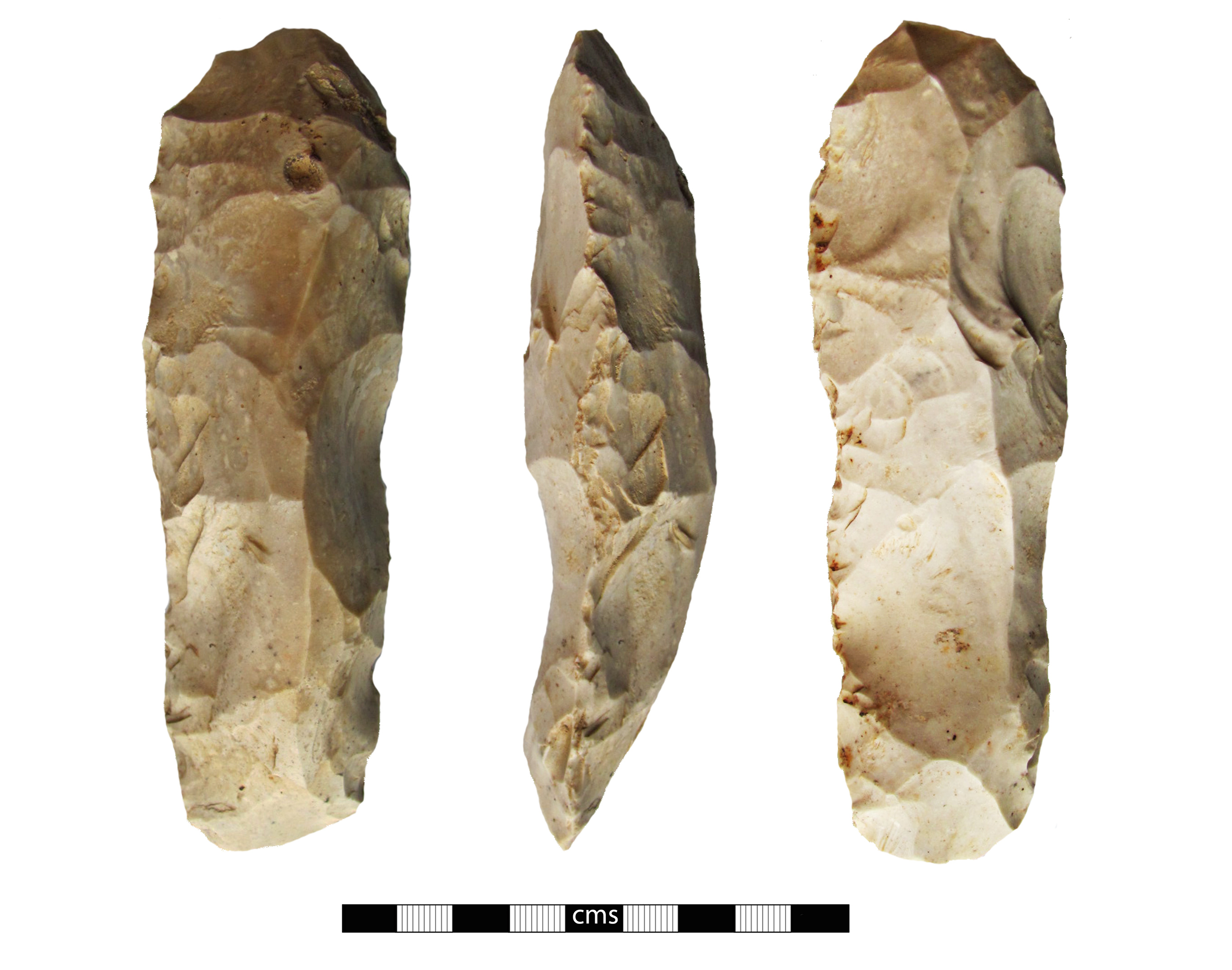
Mesolithic, flint tranchet adze found in West Berkshire, UK

Archeologists have unearthed these axes from various time periods in excavation sites on many continents. They have been found in some Acheulean assemblages as well as in Mesolithic flaked stone industries. Archeologists have also excavated tranchet axes from Central American sites, including the Mayan site of Cohla, Belize. An archeologist working in the Solomon Islands believes that tranchet axes have been used there as adze-heads until recent times.

The axes were typically made from hard stones like flint, chert, agate or other types of rock that could hold a sharp edge when struck.

Archeologists believe that the axe’s principal use was as an adze; that is, as a tool whose cutting edge is perpendicular to the handle, not parallel. Tranchet axes would have been used primarily for cutting, chopping, and shaping wood while building shelters, making dugout canoes, and crafting tools and weapons. The tranchet axe might have been used to fell lighter timber or for coppicing.

== See also ==
- Hand axe
