= Pick (hieroglyph) =

Egyptian hieroglyph

U17 U18
Pick
in hieroglyphs

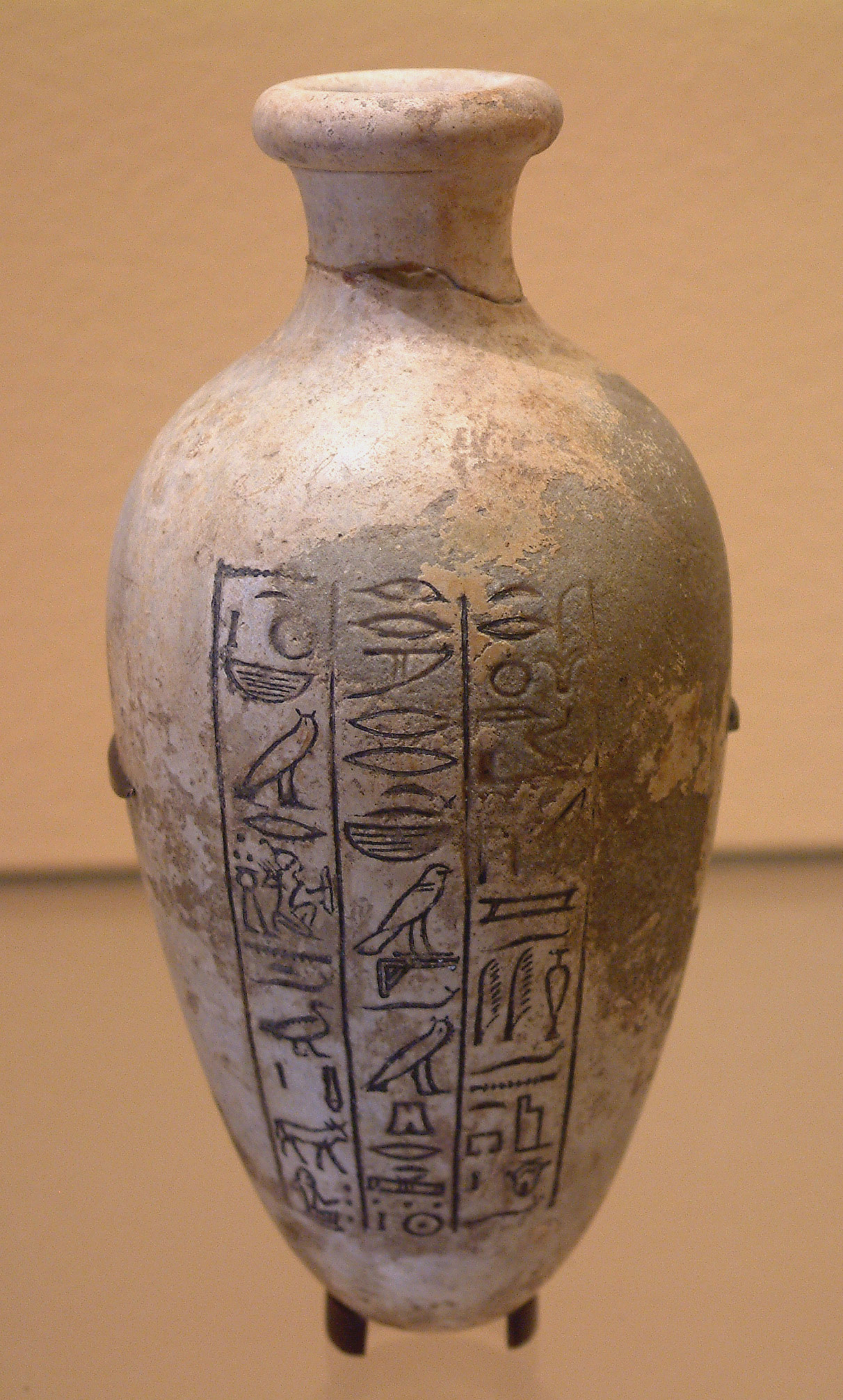
Pot, with Pick hieroglyph at bottom, middle column (reads from right-to-left, Columns 3-2-1).

The ancient Egyptian Pick hieroglyph, Gardiner sign listed nos. U17, U18 is a portrayal of a 'pick upon the side view of a block'; it is in the Gardiner subset for agriculture, crafts, and professions.

In the Egyptian language, the pick hieroglyph is used as an ideogram or determinative for grg, the verb "to pick through", or for other related words.

== Verb: to settle, found, establish; (also dismantle) ==
Though the pick hieroglyph shows: 'use of a pick, upon a surface', the verb "to choose" is not implied. The Egyptian language verb for 'to pick or select' is used by "to choose", the commonly used stp hieroglyph, an adze, or specifically the 'adze-on-block (hieroglyph)', Gardiner no. U21, U21, also in the Gardiner subset of agriculture, crafts, and professions.
The pick hieroglyph in Budge's two volume dictionary has twelve entries, the final three dealing with "lies" and using the determinative of the sparrow (hieroglyph), for 'bad', 'evil', Gardiner no. G37 G37, (and not a swallow hieroglyph, virtually identical). The main definition of the pick hieroglyph seems to be to pick at (earth), implying use of the pick as a tool for creating a townsite, and 'constructing'; it translates as a verb, to found, establish, settle; also to make ready to be habitable, equip, furnish, and prepare. Budge's dictionary sources are c. 150 authors, and c. 200 sources: papyri, steles, literature, reliefs, etc. For grg, "to settle", "to establish", etc. he uses: 1. funerary texts of Pepi I, (and 2. texts of Pepi II), 3. texts of King Teta, 4. Gaston Maspero's 1880 Recueil..., vol 1. (in progress), 5. an El-Bersheh, London document-(undated), 6. and "A. Z.", German Zeitschrift fur..., 1863, vol. 1, (a work in progress).

== Example usage: 24th century BC, Palermo Stone ==
U17 O10
Pick-
(upon Townsite)
(example)
in hieroglyphs

From circa 2392 BC (24th to 23rd century BC), the Palermo Piece-(obverse) of the 7—piece Palermo Stone contains two uses of the pick hieroglyph. They occur as a pair in Row III (of VI rows) for a "King Year Register" for Pharaoh, King Den.

They are used above 2 rectangular blocks, with the names of cities inside, and the determinative for town: O49. They are similar to the symbol for "Horus in a Chamber", Gardiner no. O10, O10, but replaced by hieroglyphs that name the 2 townsites.

== See also ==
- List of Egyptian hieroglyphs
