= Tranchet flake =

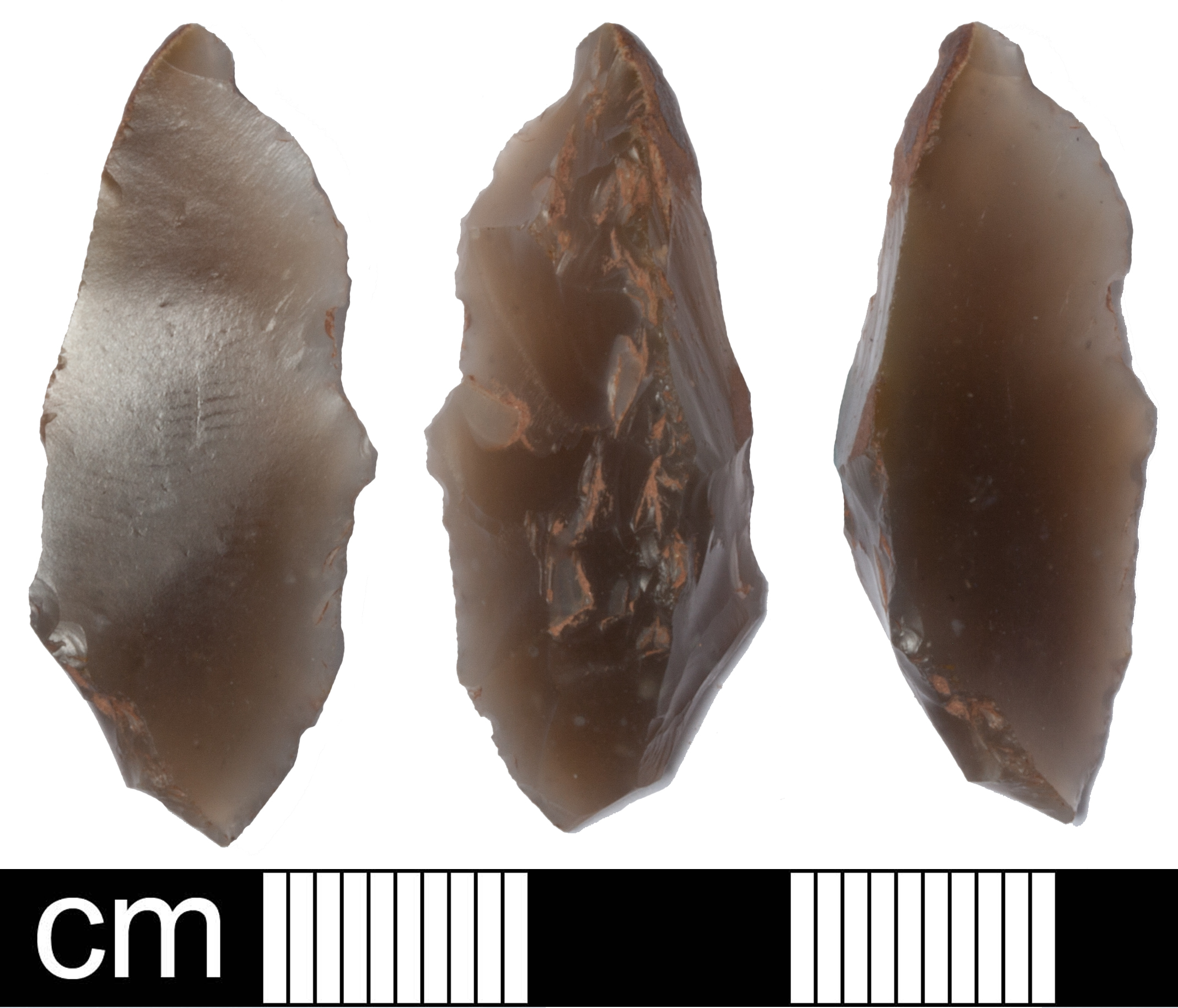
Late Mesolithic tranchet flake.

In archaeology, a tranchet flake is a characteristic type of flake removed by a flintknapper during lithic reduction. Known as one of the major categories in core-trimming flakes, the making of a tranchet flake involves removing a flake parallel to the final intended cutting edge of the tool which creates a single straight edge as wide as the tool itself. A large flint artifact with a chisel-end, the tranchet flake has a cutting edge that is sharp and straight. The cutting edge is unmodified in most cases; sometimes, it is polished for increased durability and/or sharpness.

== Creation ==
To make a tranchet flake, a flintknapper can hold the core from which the tranchet flake is to be removed in two ways: freehand or with it supported against the leg. Knapping freehand allows for greater control while supporting the core against the leg makes the work easier.

The technique used to make the tranchet flake was used in the making of other tools as well, including tranchet axes (characterized by their trapezoidal or triangular shape) adzes, and even tranchet arrowheads. Unlike chisel arrowheads, tranchet arrowheads are transverse: this means they are knapped sideways, along the width of the flake versus the length of a flake like in the making of a chisel arrowhead. Also different is that tranchet arrowheads are made from a blade struck off a core versus being made from debitage like chisel arrowheads. The edge of the flake could be sharpened again by removing another flake from it.

== Tranchet technique ==
Known as the tranchet technique that makes the tranchet flake, this term can be defined in two ways: first, it is the forming of a straight edge used to cut from the edge of the tranchet flake by taking off a large flat flake from the tip. Second, it can be defined as the method one uses to resharpen or form the cutting edge of either an ax or an adze.

Evidence of the technique of the tranchet flake was first discovered in sites of the Acheulean age, and the flake is a corresponding technology to the Upper Paleolithic era. It is found in some Acheulean assemblages, and handaxes created using the method are called tranchet axes. They can be identified by the damaged edge (damaged from use) on their back side.

Tranchet flakes were used to form other tools or weapons which would vary in shape and size. For this reason, the size and shape of tranchet flakes varies widely as well.

In later Neolithic times, the tranchet flake seems to have been replaced by something known as edge-abrasion. Abrasion apparently was not as damaging as the tranchet flake technique (it kept more of the original tool or weapon intact) and tools were less likely to break with edge-abrasion than with a tranchet flake.

== Tranchet experiment ==
At the Acheulean site of Boxgrove, West Sussex, England, the area containing Lower Paleolithic deposits on site is one of the largest in Europe. Included in the site are tranchet flakes; the site is deemed to be a place that was continually used for flintknapping.

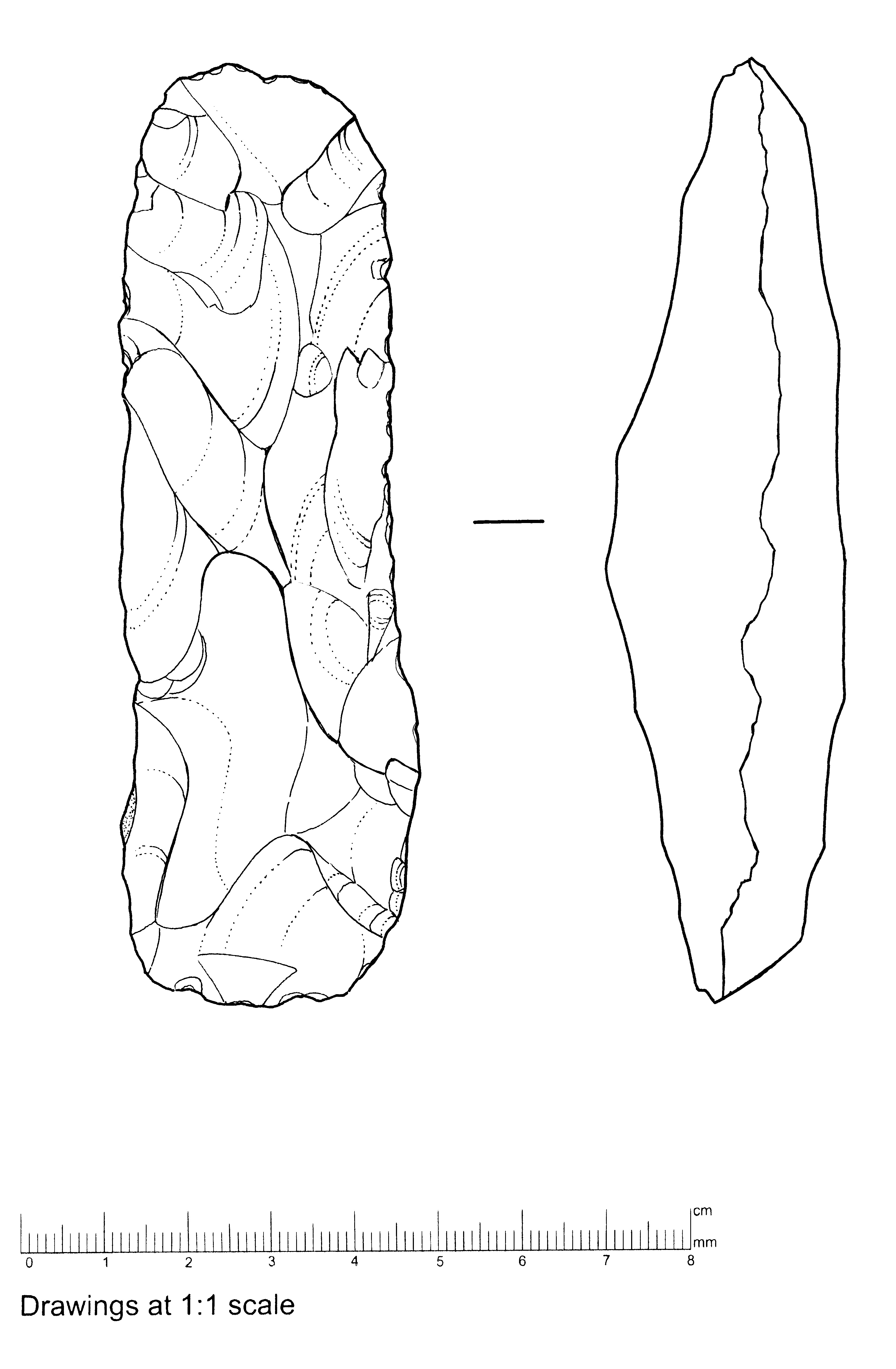
A flint Mesolithic tranchet axe

An experiment concerning this site was conducted that would replicate the tranchet axes found in Boxgrove (a total of 314 tranchet axes were found at the site). Using seven people who were right-handed and able to flintknap, the experiment showed that hand preference did not restrict which side was used during the tranchet flake removal. Four of the knappers produced flakes using both directions (right-struck and left-struck). Three knappers used the same direction all the time. The study also revealed that when the flintknapper had become skilled enough to be able to produce a tranchet flake, the range of flake types knappers can produce increases.

Proving that hand preference did not restrict which side was used to remove flakes allowed those excavating the Boxgrove site to see that the knappers there preferred to remove tranchet flakes from the left side. However, it was noted habit could have come into play here: the knappers may have had a routine habit in making the tranchet flakes. However, the difference between handheld and supported against the leg knapping may also play a role: though handheld allows more control, supporting the core could allow for the production of what is deemed as the more difficult tranchet flake for right handers -the ones made from being struck from the left side.

Another reason why the results between the experiment and real-life may be different is also the techniques and methods of making tranchet flakes. For example, the use of an antler hammer was similar between the two. But things like the postures flintknappers have while knapping and how they used both of their hands (the various positioning while knapping) of those past people of the Boxgrove site cannot be known.

The experiment did show that a huge variety of holding positions exist, though the holding constraints did not affect how tranchet flakes were produced.

== Gallery ==
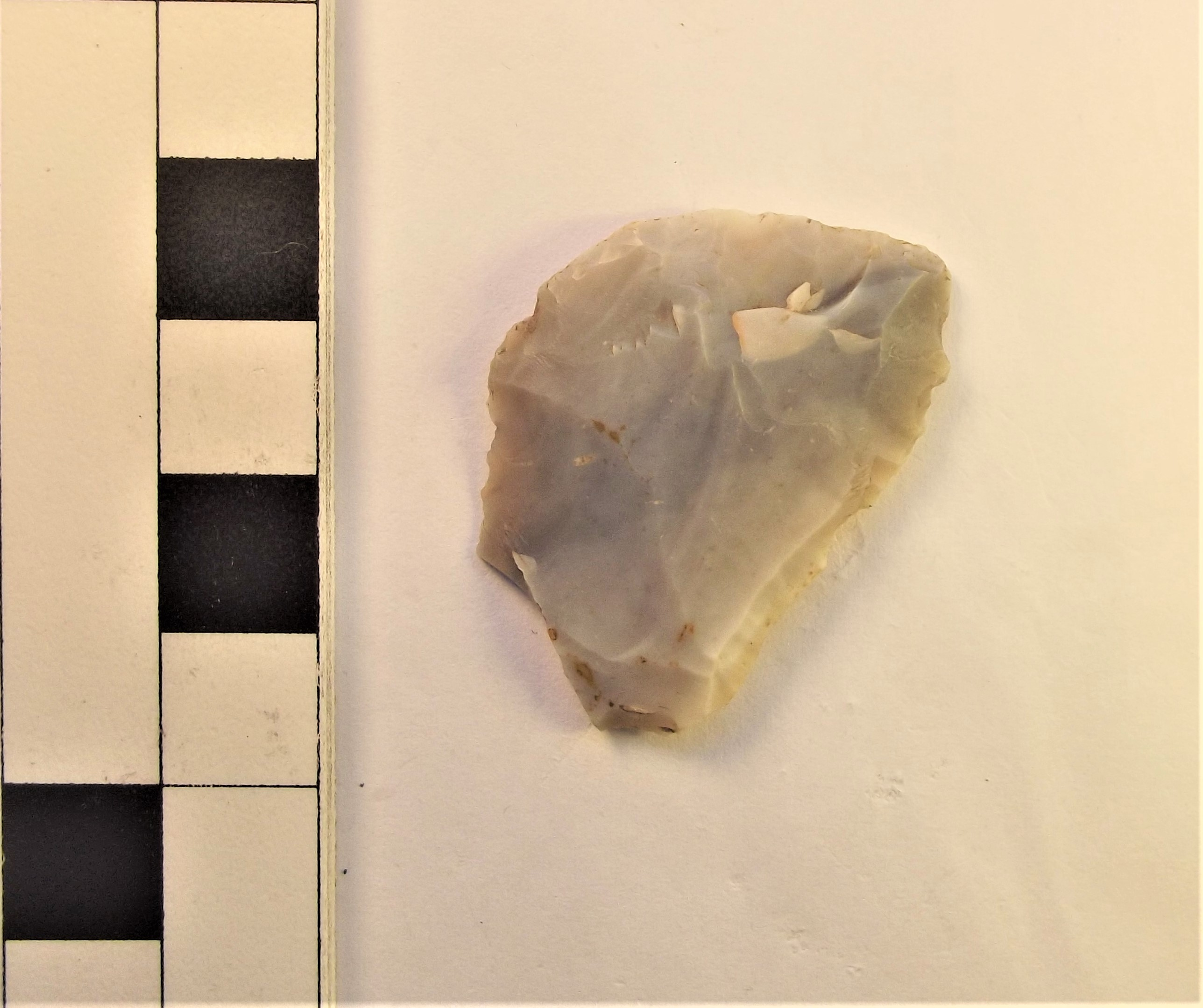
Flint tranchet flake

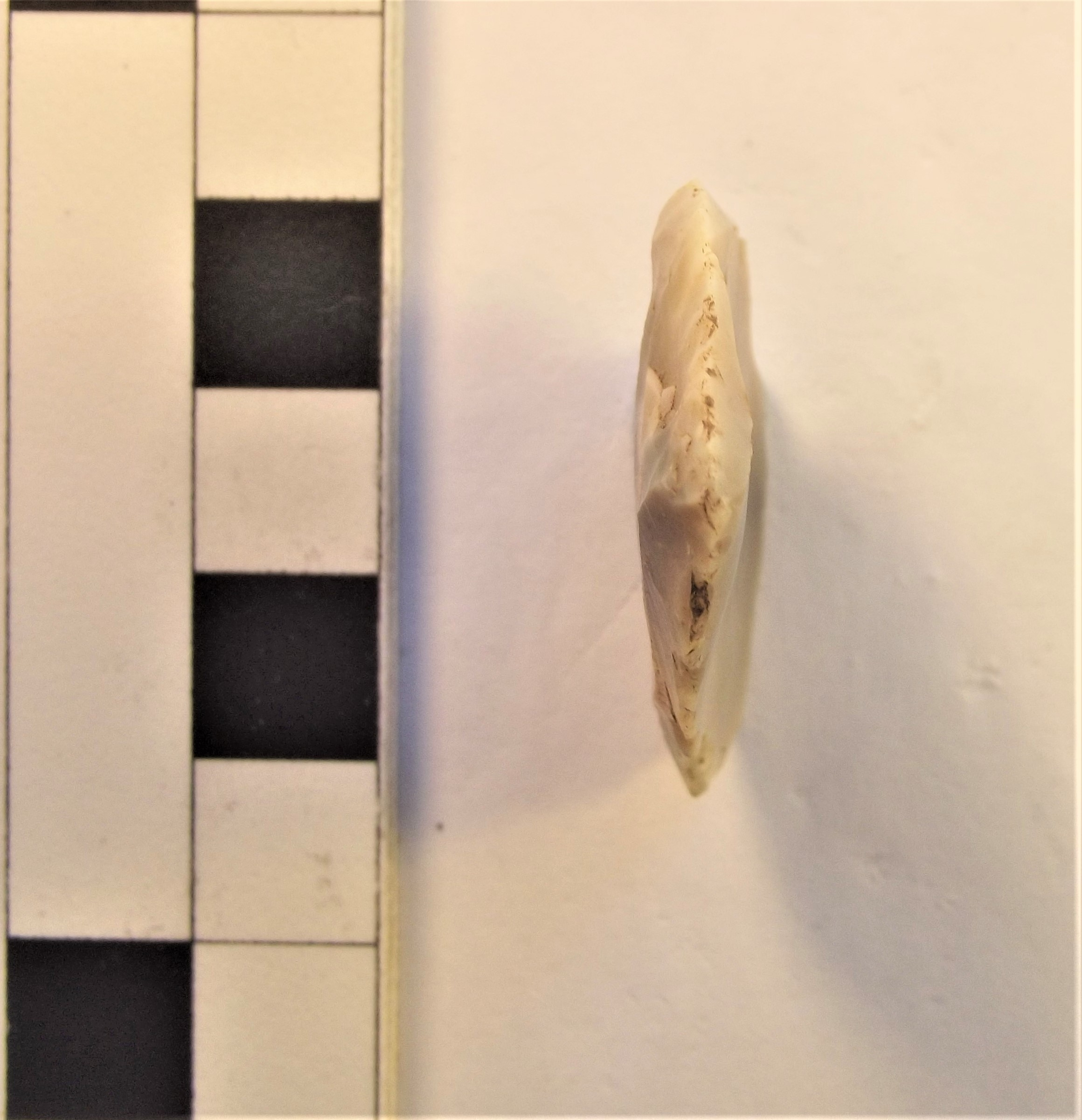
Flint tranchet flake, side view

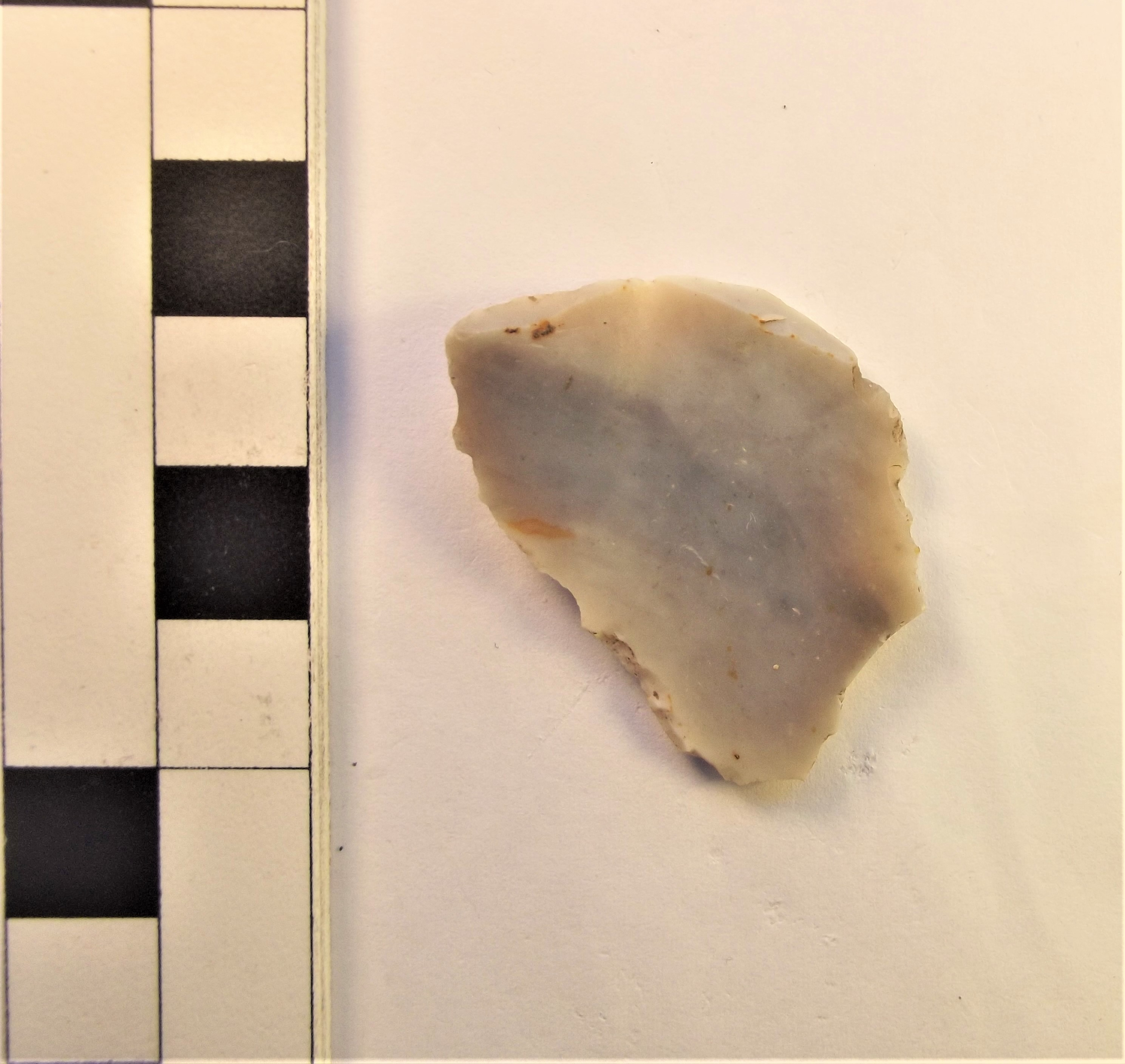
Flint tranchet flank, bottom view

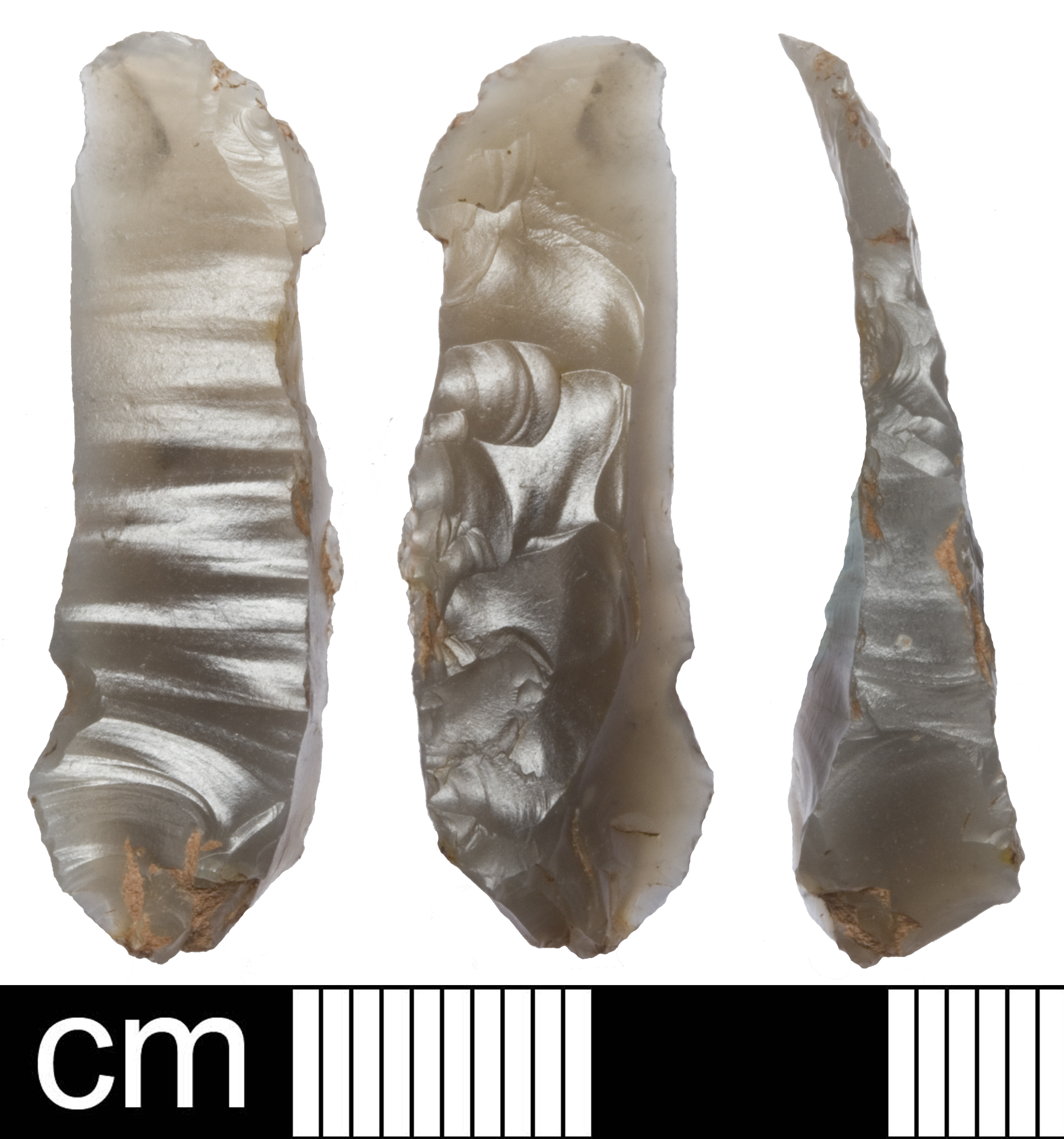
Mesolithic tranchet flake
