= Adze-on-block (hieroglyph) =

Egyptian hieroglyph

U21
Adze-on-Block
in hieroglyphs

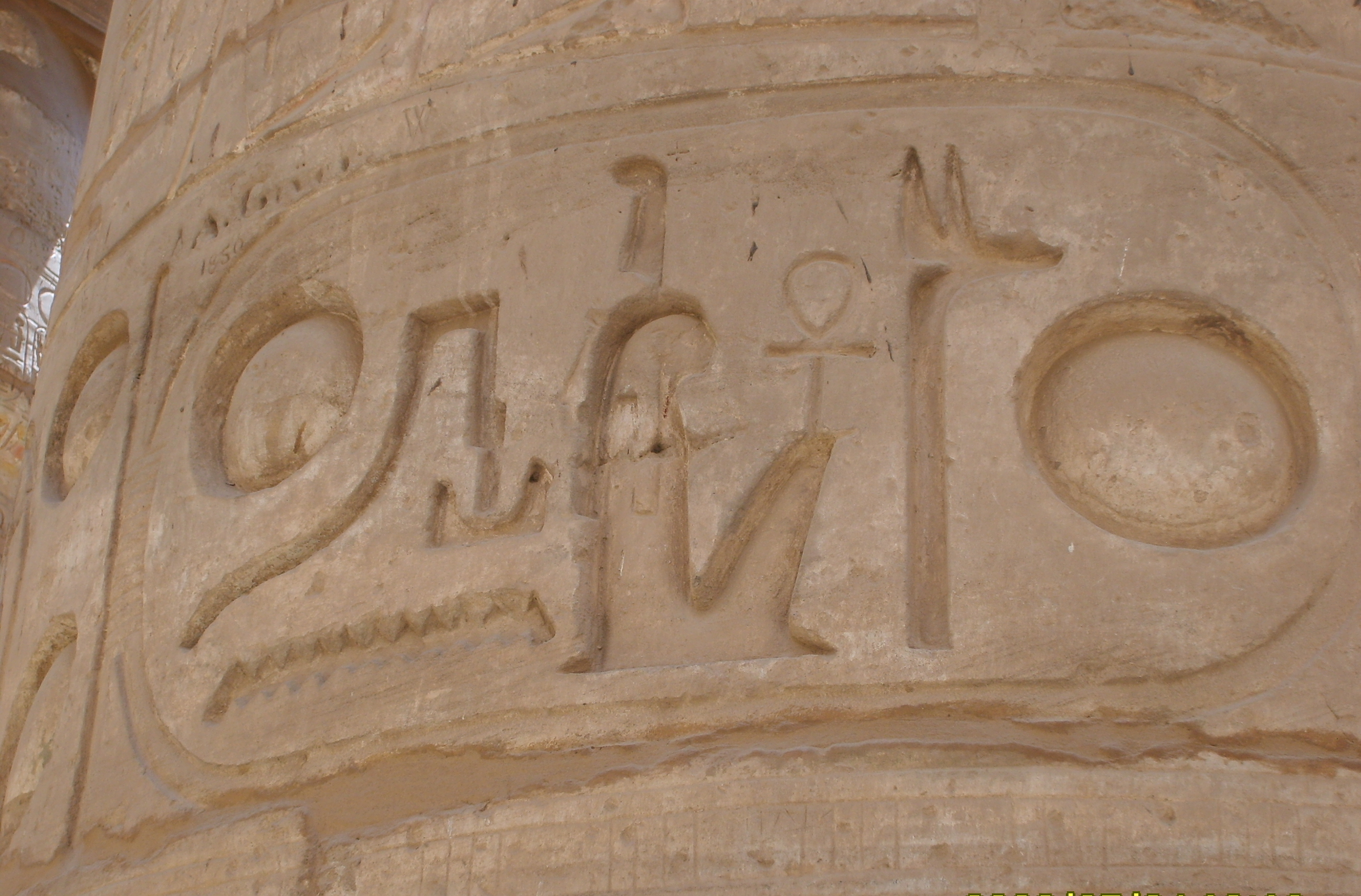
Cartouche on pillar.

The ancient Egyptian Adze on a Wood Block, or Axe in a Block of Wood hieroglyph, Gardiner sign listed no. U20, is a portrayal of the adze. It is used mostly in the cartouches of pharaonic names especially, or other important names.

The adze on block has the Egyptian language value of stp and is the verb "choose". It is used as a determinative in 'stp', "cut into pieces", and as an ideogram for 'stp', "choose", "choice".

The adze tool sign, Gardiner nos. U18 and U19, U19, U20, portray just the adze, (or hand-axe).

== Cartouche usage: "chosen of" ==
The most common usage of this hieroglyph is for a descriptor with the names in the pharaonic cartouche. An example for Ramesses II, shows his prenomen as: < ra wsr mAat stp ra n > UserMaatRe SetepeNRe, and is approximately: Maat's Power of Ra, (the) Chosen of Ra. (i.e. Maat's Powerful and Chosen (one) of Ra)

== See also ==
- Gardiner's Sign List#U. Agriculture, Crafts, and Professions
- List of Egyptian hieroglyphs
- Adze#Africa
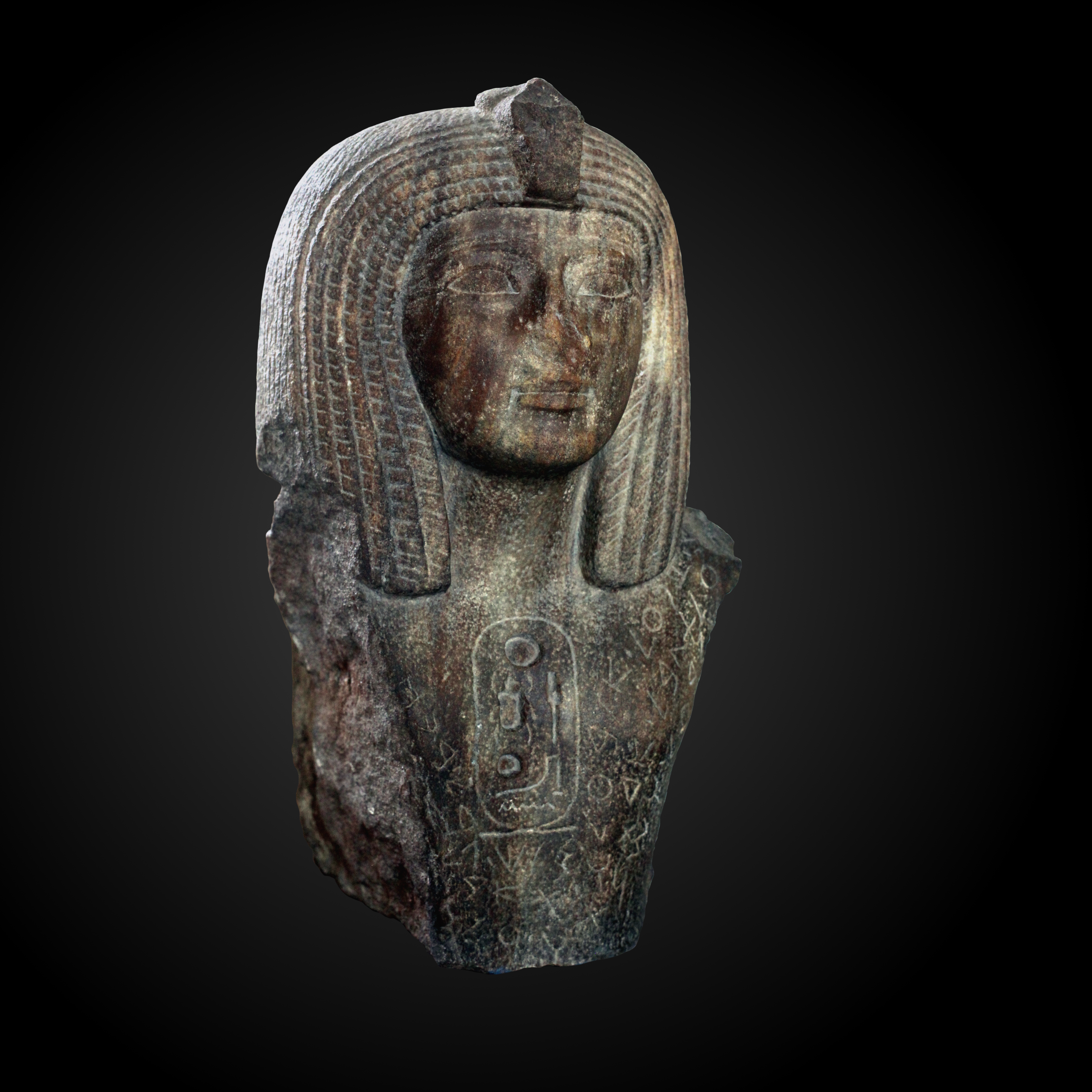
Statue of Pharaoh Osorkon I

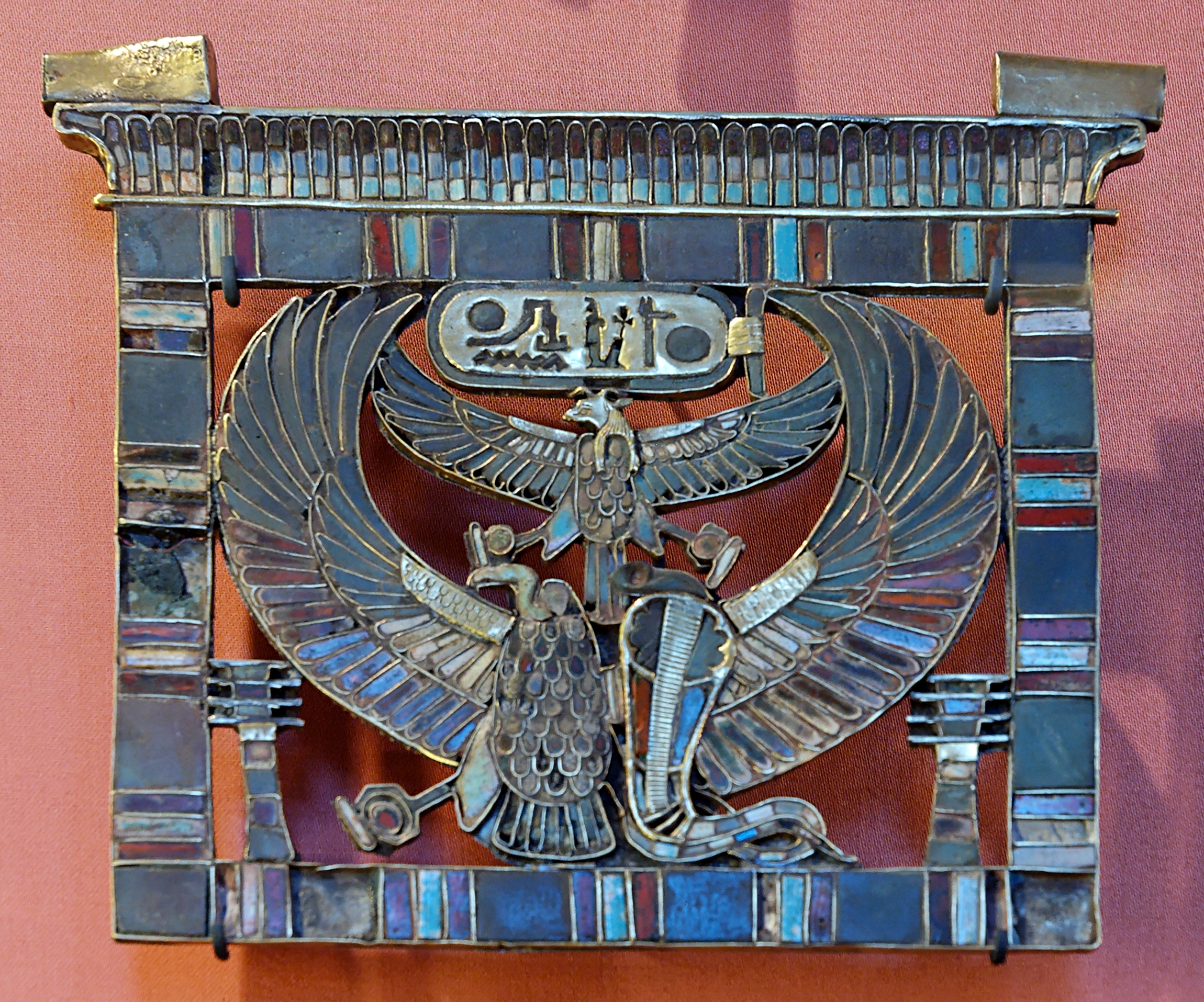
Pectoral (Ancient Egypt)

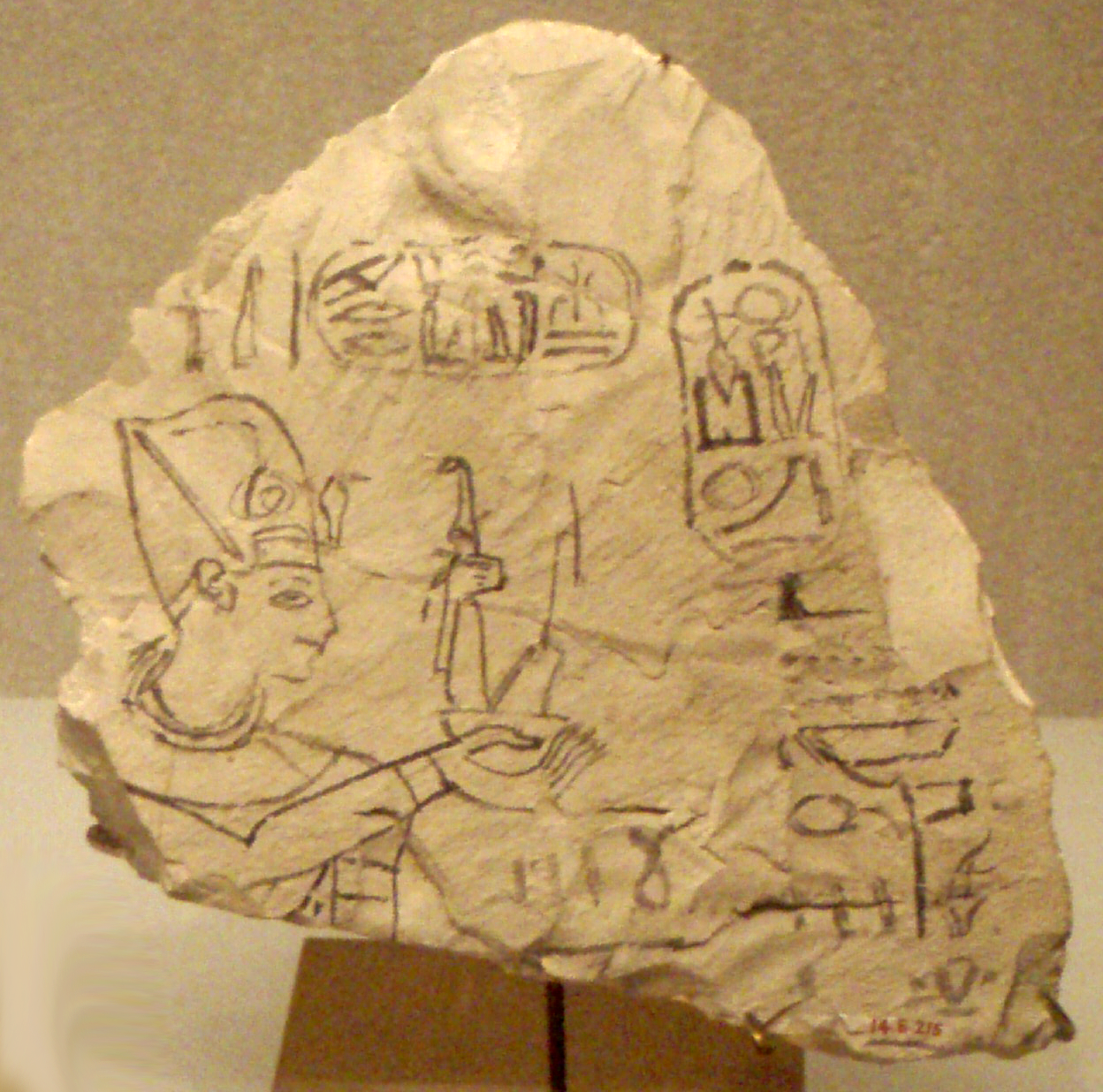
Goddess Maat (hieroglyph) on Basket hieroglyph being presented by Ramesses IX

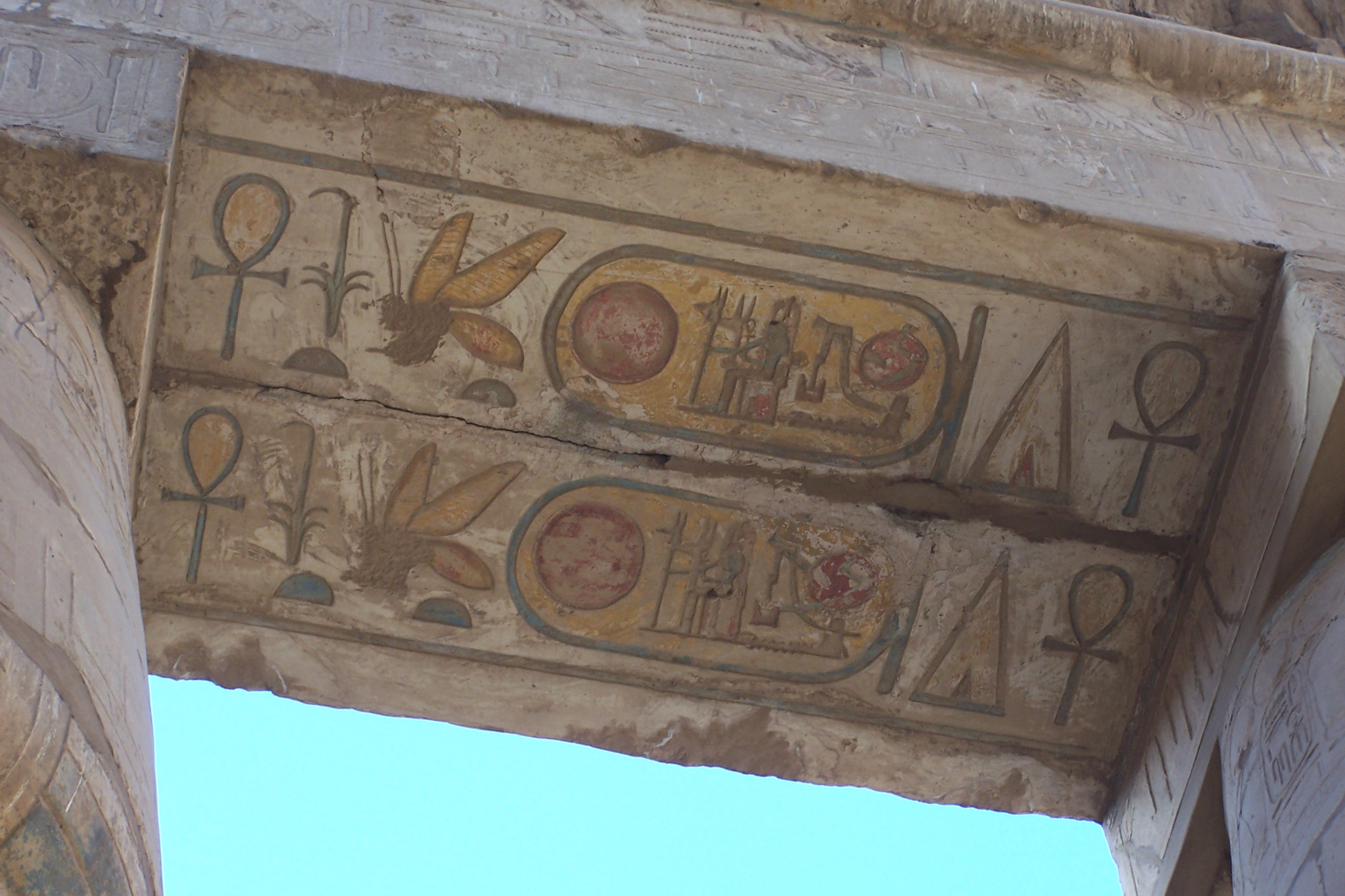
Ramses II cartouches at Karnak
