= Crooked knife =

Eastern Woodlands Native American woodworking knife

The crooked knife sometimes referred to as a "curved knife", "carving knife," or "mocotaugan," from the Cree term "môhkotâkan," is a common Eastern Woodlands Native American woodworking knife. The crooked in "crooked knife" refers to the unusual shape of the knife, namely a blade that is set at an oblique angle to the handle. The blade can be straight or curved, long or short. Many blades were fashioned from re-worked file blades, reused hardened steel. and other sources. The Hudson's Bay Company started to import pre-made steel Crooked Knife blades from Sheffield England, shipped without handles, specifically for trade with Native Americans. The shape of the blade, whether curved or straight, is a function of the carving purpose of the user: straight for whittling wood, making splints for baskets and incising, curved for hollowing out bowls and masks and ladles, as well as myriad other usages.

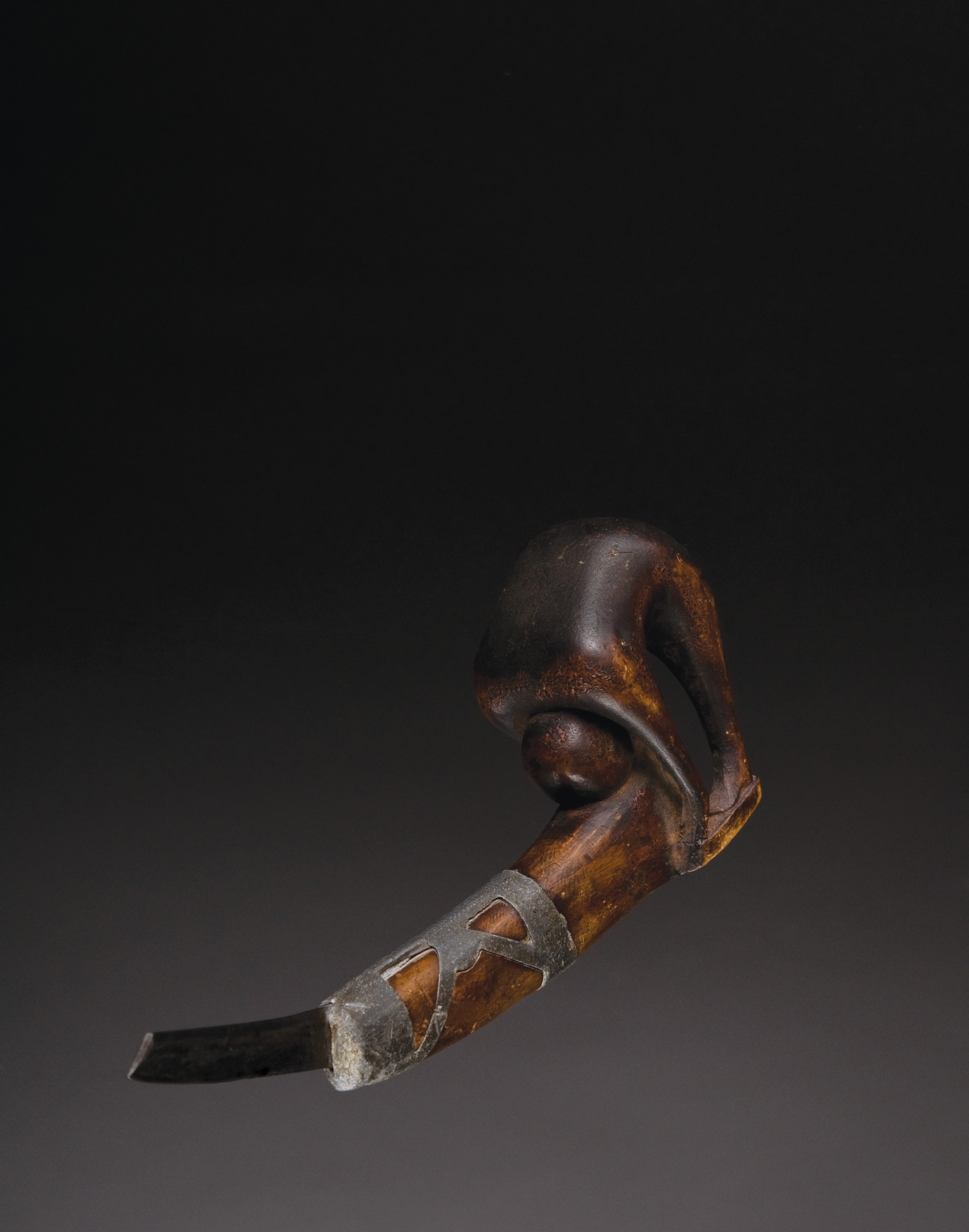
A finely carved Crooked Knife in the form of a Bending Woman c. 1800–1825. Private Collection

Because of the unique shape of the knife, the wooden handle extends beyond the hand that is gripping it. This exposed pommel became a prime place for Native American artists to express themselves and examples of carved Crooked knives can be found in collections across the world.

The 1971 documentary César et son canot d'écorce (César's Bark Canoe) illustrates the use of a crooked knife in the construction of a birch-bark canoe.

== Description and Usage ==
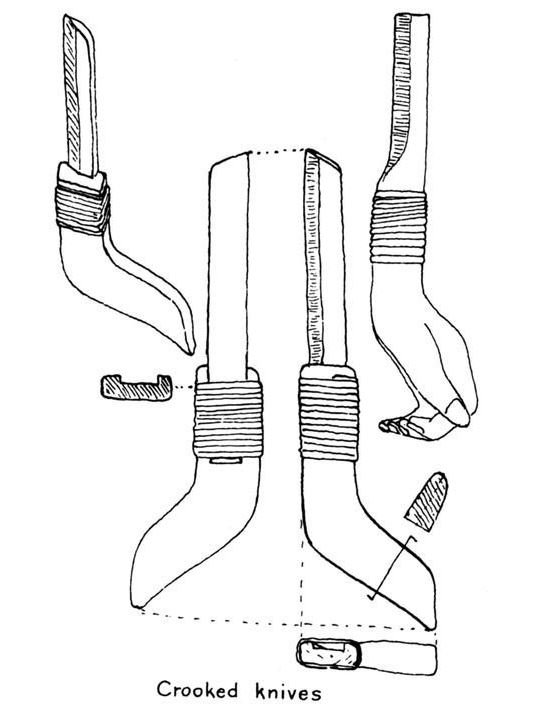
Crooked Knife

John McPhee states, "The blade was bent near its outer end (enabling it to move in grooves and hollows where the straight part could not). The grip, fashioned for convenience of a hand closing over it, was bulbous. The blade had no hinge and protruded rigidly — but not straight out. It formed a shallow V with the grip."

Adney and Chapelle state, "The knife, held with the cutting edge toward the user, was grasped fingers-up with the thumb of the holding hand laid along the part of the handle projecting away from the user. This steadied the knife in cutting. Unlike a jackknife, the crooked knife was not used to whittle but to cut toward the user, and was, in effect, a one-hand drawknife."

According to Henri Vaillancourt, "The original crooked knife was made out of a beaver's tooth." This has been supported from archeological digs as well as multiple historical sources.

== Further reading/external links ==
- Jalbert, Ned 2024, Thestoryandartofhtecrookedknife.com
- Thestoryandartofthecrookedknife.com
- Jalbert, Ned & Russell. (2003). Mocotaugan : The story and art of the crooked knife : the Woodlands Indian's indispensable survival tool. Jalbert, Ned. (1st Edition 200 hardbound copies, 1000 Thesis bound copies ed.). Nantucket, Mass.: Metacom Pub. Co. ISBN 0-9742804-0-2. OCLC 62430190. Archived from the original on March 21, 2015.
- The Native-American Mocotaugan / Couteau Croche / Crooked Knife, article and bibliography by Paul H. S. Gaboriault
- The Crooked Knife article at the Native Art in Canada website
- crooked knife circa 1750 from the Davistown Museum collection
