= Naqada II =

Archaeological stage in prehistoric Egypt

Coordinates: 29°27′N 31°12′E

Naqada II (3500—3325 BC)
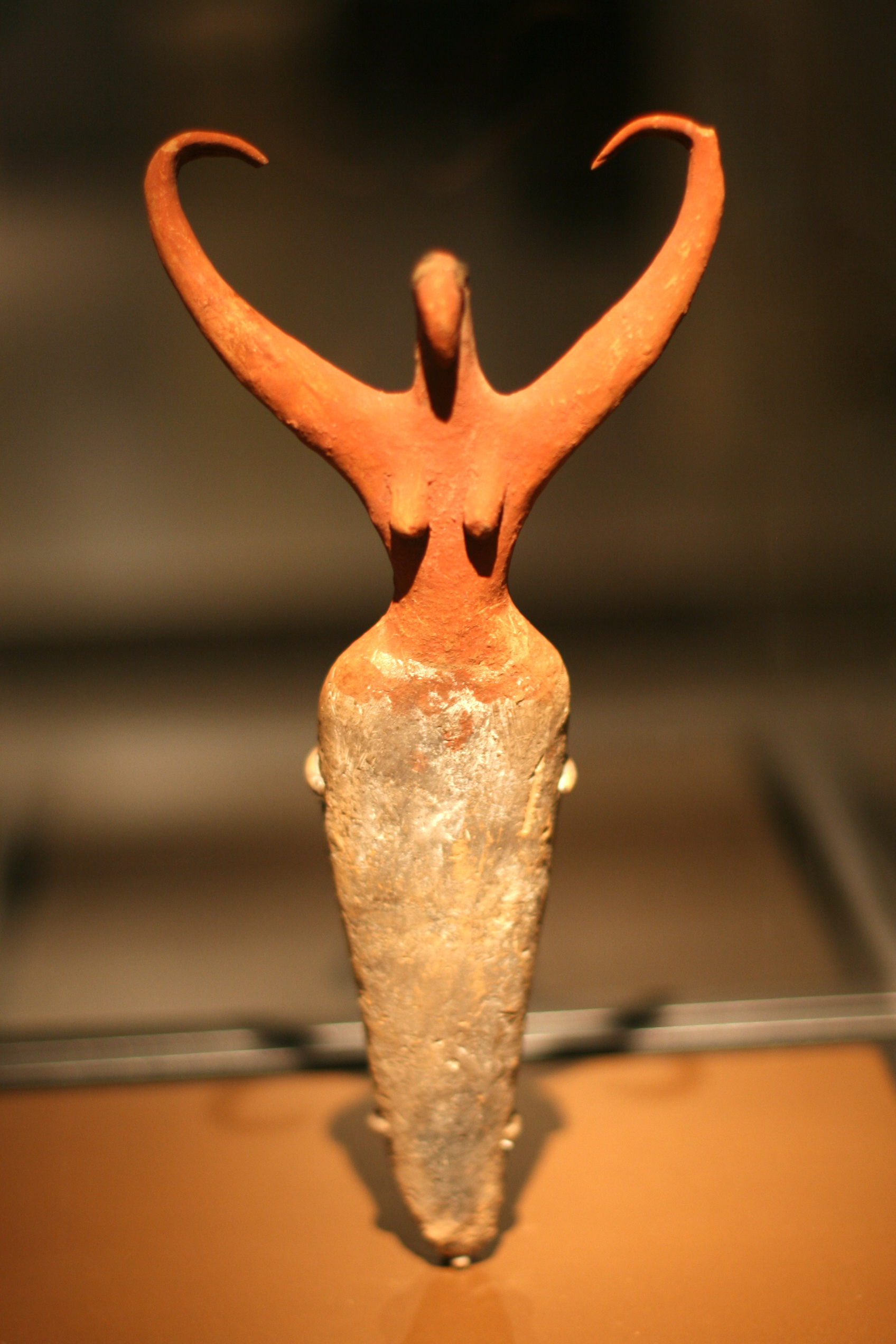
- Female statuette, El Ma’marîya. Naqada IIA, 3500-3400 BC. Brooklyn Museum. Naqada II main sites, with central area (●)
- Dates: c. 3,500 BC — c. 3,325 BC
- Major sites: Naqada, Abydos, Gebelein, Hierakonpolis, el-Girzeh
- Preceded by: Naqada I (Amratian)
- Followed by: Naqada III (Semainian)

Naqada II refers to the second Pre-dynastic archaeological stage centered around the Naqada region of Upper Egypt. It was formerly also called Gerzeh culture, after discoveries at Gerzeh (also Girza or Jirzah), a small prehistoric Egyptian cemetery located along the west bank of the Nile but much farther north, where Flinders Petrie first characterized this period in the 19th century. Gerzeh is situated only a few miles due east of the oasis of Faiyum, but was only peripheral to the Naqada culture. Depending on the sources, the Naqada II period is dated from c. 3,500 BC to c. 3,325 BC, from c. 3,650 BC to c. 3,300 BC, or from 3,500 to 3,200 BC. Naqada II had many types of potteries, which were categorized chronologically by Petrie from SD ("Sequence Date") 38 to 62. It is coeval with the Uruk period in Mesopotamia.

Naqada II is the second of three phases of the prehistoric Naqada cultures, and was preceded by Naqada I (also known as the "Amratian culture"), and followed by Naqada III (also known as the "protodynastic" or "Semainian culture").

The end of the period, namely Naqada IID, is thought to correspond to the origins of Dynastic Egypt, a process which was further strengthened during the periods of Naqada IIIa and Dynasty 0. Naqada IID saw the inception of kingship, writing, and organized religion, which would become the basis of the classical Egyptian civilization.

== Historical context ==
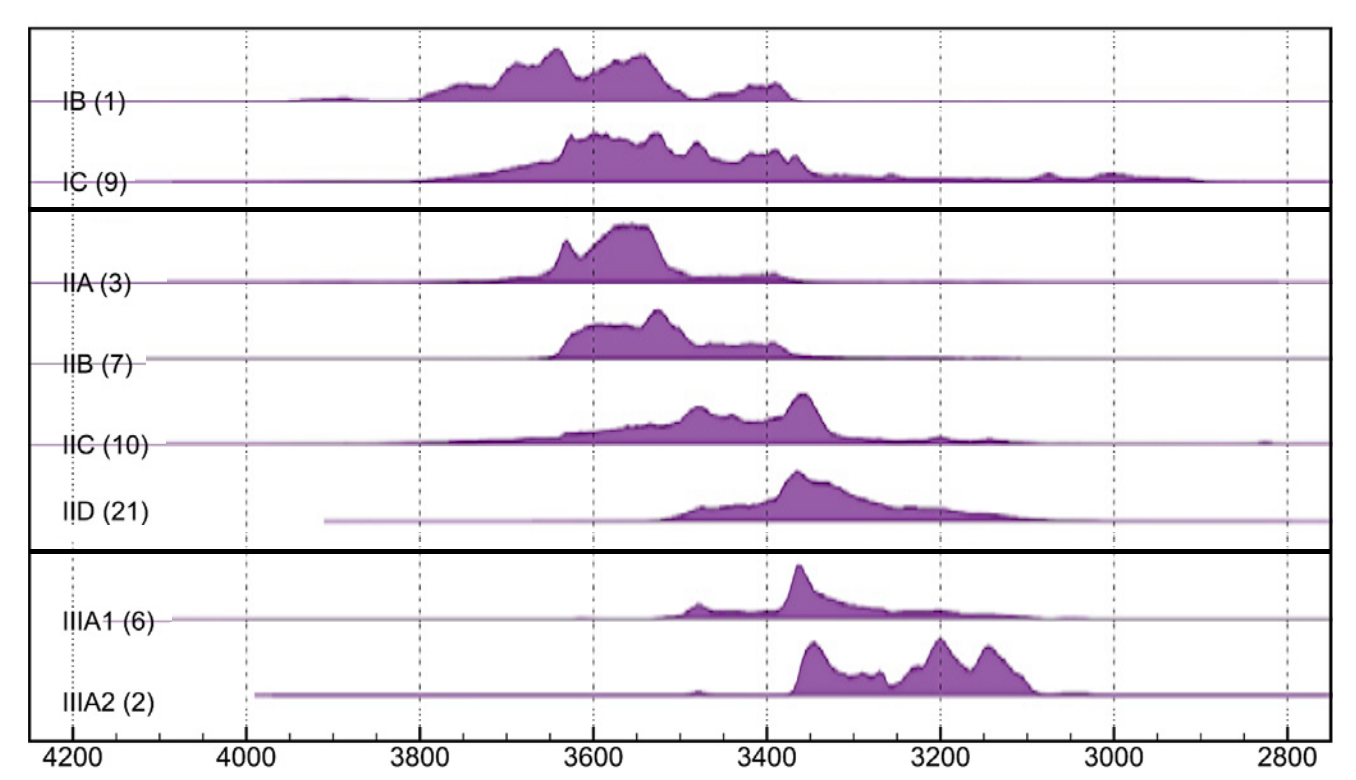
Calibrated carbon-14 dates for Naqada periods broadly confirm the traditional dating scheme.

Sources differ on dating, some saying use of the culture distinguishes itself from the Amratian and begins circa 3500 BC lasting through circa 3200 BC. Accordingly, some authorities place the onset of the Gerzeh coincident with the Amratian or Badari cultures, i.e. c.3800 BC to 3650 BC, even though some Badarian artifacts, in fact, may date earlier. The Naqada sites were first divided by the British Egyptologist Flinders Petrie in 1894, into Amratian (after the cemetery near el-Amrah) and "Gerzean" (after the cemetery near Gerzeh) sub-periods.

The Naqada II culture lasted through a period of time when the desertification of the Sahara had nearly reached its state seen during the late twentieth century.

The primary distinguishing feature between the earlier Amratian and the Gerzeh is the extra decorative effort exhibited in the pottery of the period. Artwork on Gerzeh ceramics features stylised animals and environment to a greater degree than the earlier Amratian artwork. Further, images of ostriches on the pottery artwork possibly indicate an inclination these early peoples may have felt to explore the Sahara desert.

=== Economy: the "City of Gold' ===
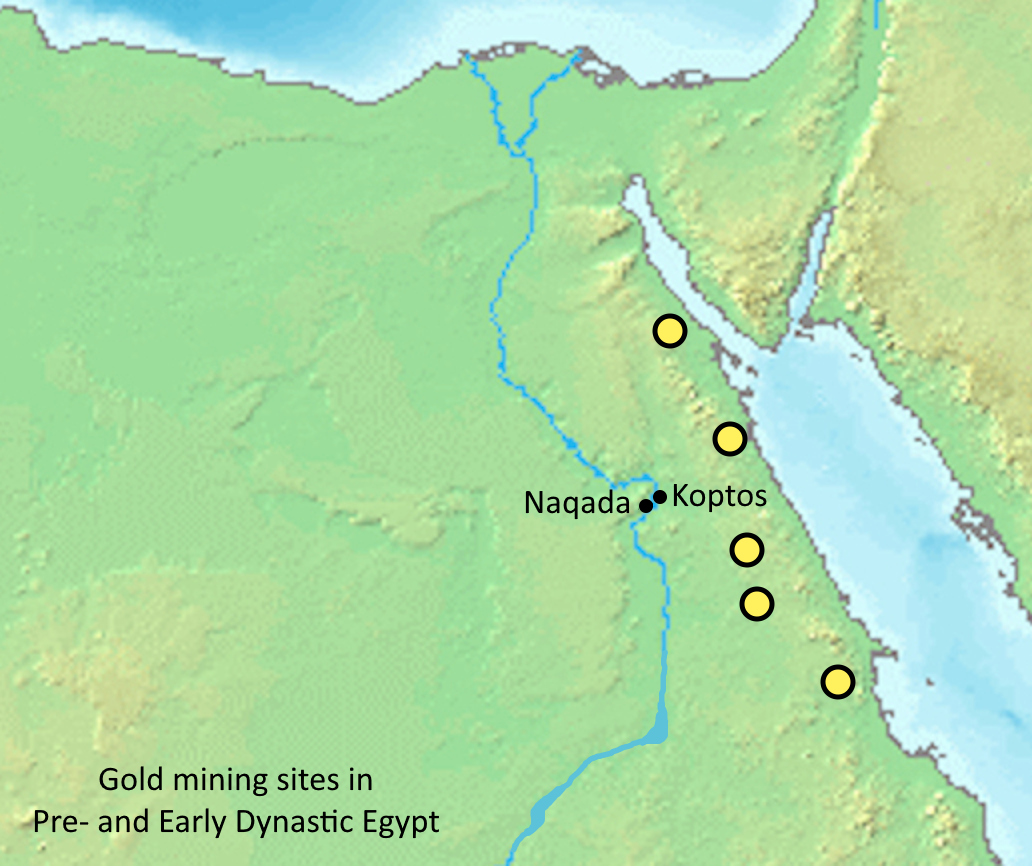
Gold mining sites (●) in Pre- and Early Dynastic Egypt.

"Naqada" (Nubt) literally means "City of Gold", reflecting the exceptional wealth of the eastern desert region in gold, and the strategic position of Naqada and its facing town of Koptos for the commerce of that gold.

The exploitation of precious metals from the Eastern Desert, and the development of floodplain agriculture creating surpluses which could generate demand for a variety of crafts, made the region especially advanced in term of economic specialization and diversification, much more advanced than the regions of contemporary Lower Egypt.

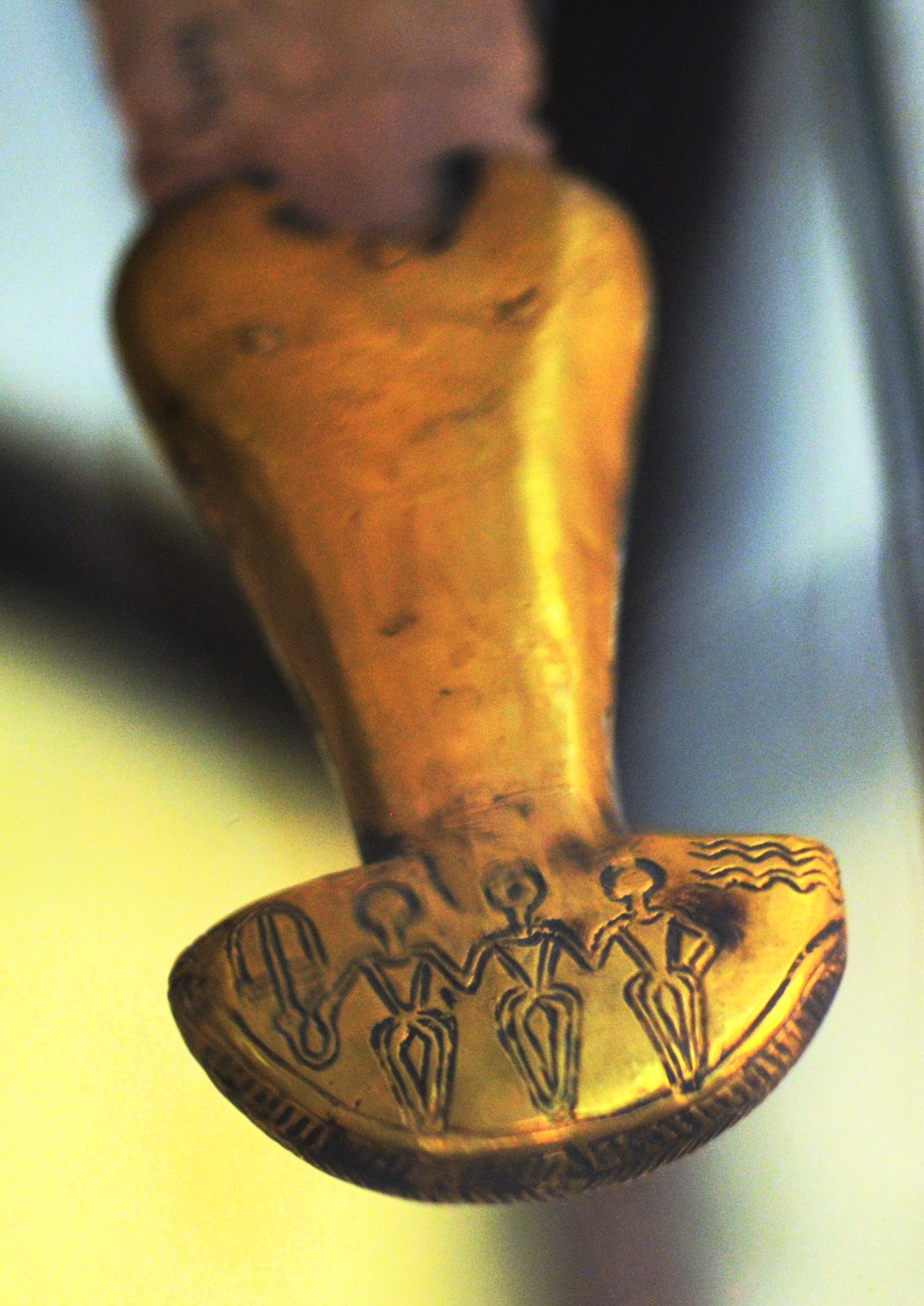
Flint knife with gold handle, Naqada II, c.3500 BC. Cairo Museum.

Gold production is documented through the creation of gold artifacts, going as far back as about 3500 BCE. Gold was obtained mainly from the older and younger granites of the Eastern Desert, through open pits and moderate underground digging.

Imports from Mesopotamia appear to have been quite intensive during the late Gerzean period (late Naqada II), and correspond to the Protoliterate b and c cultures of Mesopotamia (Uruk period). Mesopotamians may have been attracted by the fact that Naqada was at the center of the developing trade of gold from the Eastern Desert of Egypt. This may have stimulated the direct involvement of Mesopotamian adventurers and traders, who, accompanied by artists and various skilled personnel, may have introduced Mesopotamian styles and practices. The fact that Mesopotamian influence, and possibly influence from Susa, mainly appears in Upper Egypt, and is almost non-existent in Lower Egypt, suggests an independent series of direct contacts, probably through the Red Sea at a point facing Wadi Hammamat, using some of the large ships visible on Mesopotamian seals.

The exploitation of gold may also have stimulated the development of the first organized proto-state structures in Egypt.

=== Northern and southern expansion ===
The people of Naqada II and Naqada III seem to have expanded northward into Lower Egypt, replacing the Maadian culture. Maadi was first conquered during Naqada II c-d. The cultures of Lower Egypt were replaced by Upper Egypt and Naqada culture by the end of Naqada II circa 3200 BCE. The Maadian culture of Buto, Tell Ibrahim Awad, Tell el-Rub'a, and Tell el-Farkha were vacated, giving way to the Naqada III culture.

From its core in Upper Egypt, the Naqada II expanded northward to the eastern edge of the Nile Delta, and southward to the Nubian A-Group culture.

== Funerary practices ==
Most of the artifacts known from the period were discovered in tombs. Two main types of tombs are known: small shallow tombs, dug into the sand, in which the body is in the fetal position, and large rectangular tombs, dug deep into the ground and roofed, in which the bodies were dispersed in pieces.

=== Common pit graves ===
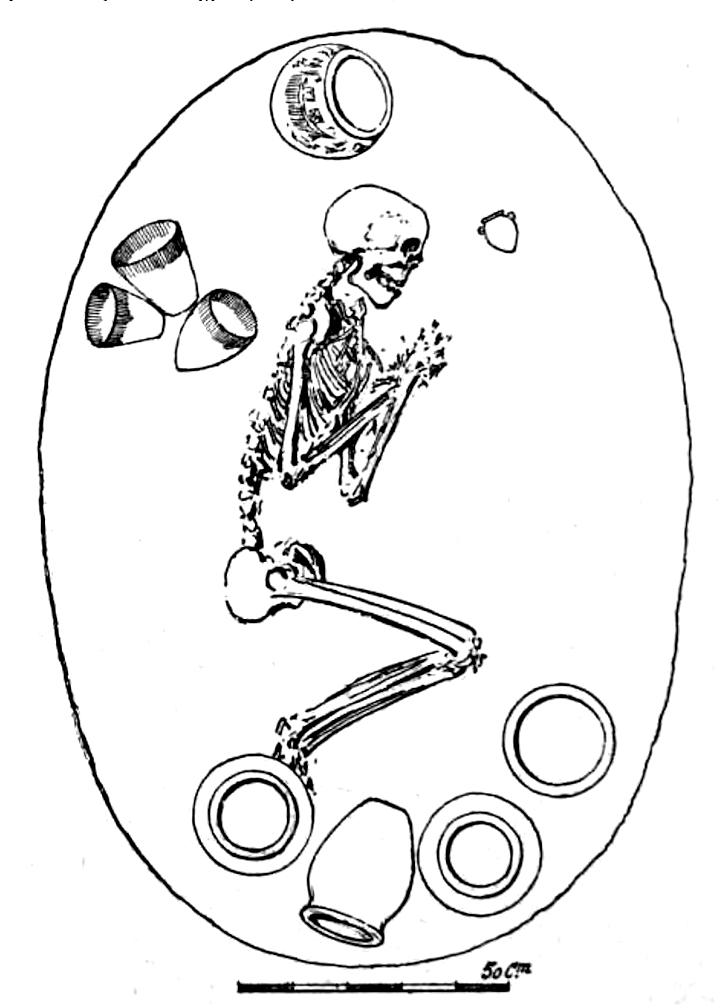
A shallow grave, Tomb 1, El Ma’marîya

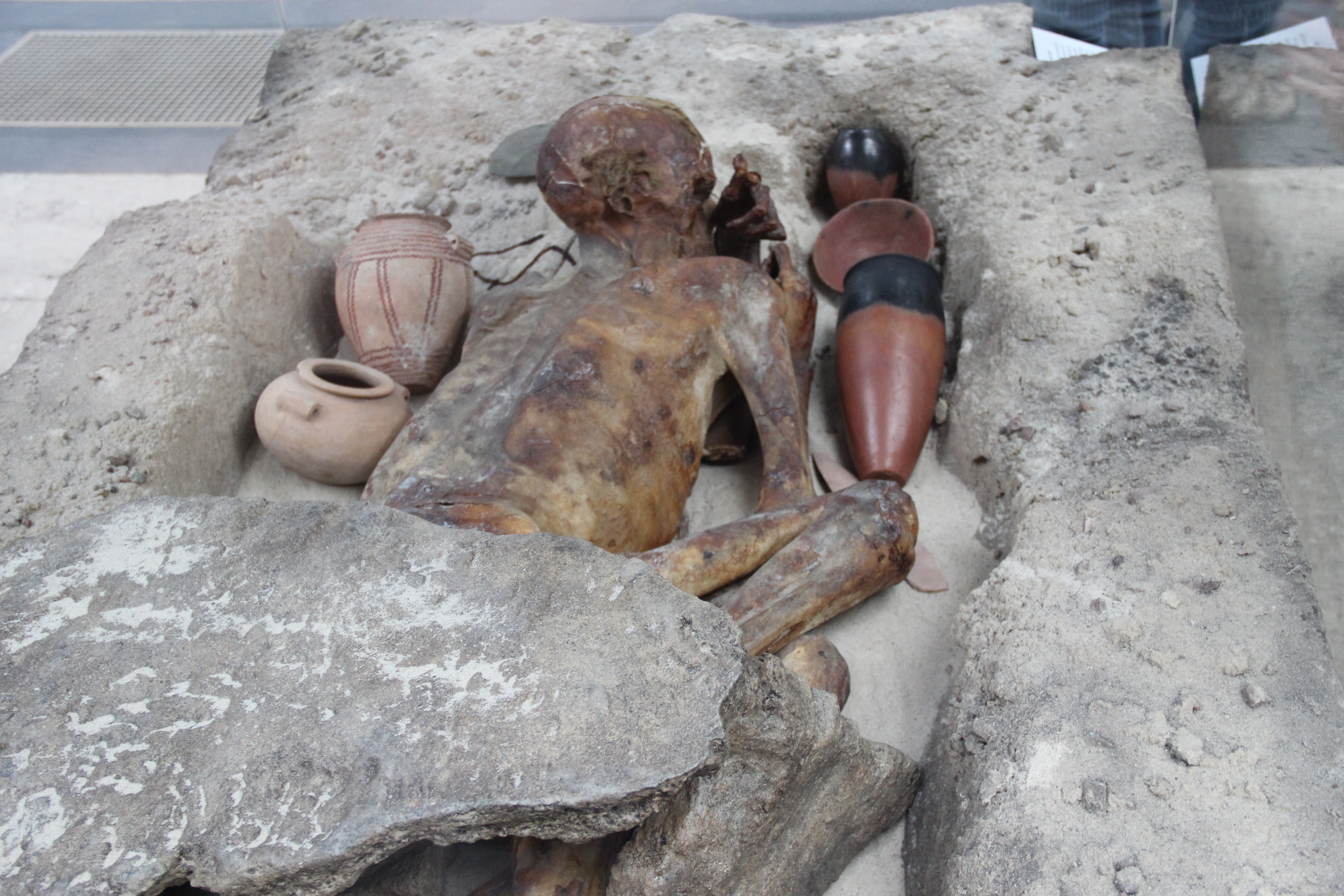
A shallow grave: tomb from Gebelein, Naqada IID-IIIB. 3400 BC (Cal. C14 dating 3341-3017BC). British Museum.

Until late in the Predynastic period, many tombs consisted in shallow graves, directly opened in the sand, sometimes covered by a mound of earth, such as Tomb 2, El Ma’marîya or the Gebelein predynastic mummies. The dry conditions often preserved the body to this day. The body were often put in a foetal position, as late as the Old Kingdom period, when body were mummified in the extended position. The bodies found in Gebelein (ca. 3400 BC) also had some of the oldest known tattoos in the world, using designs consistent with those of D-ware potteries, with animals such as the Barbary sheep or the bull, or throw-sticks and "SSSS" symbols.

The tombs usually included some utensils, including vessels for provisions for the afterlife, jewelry or slate palettes.

=== Elite tombs ===
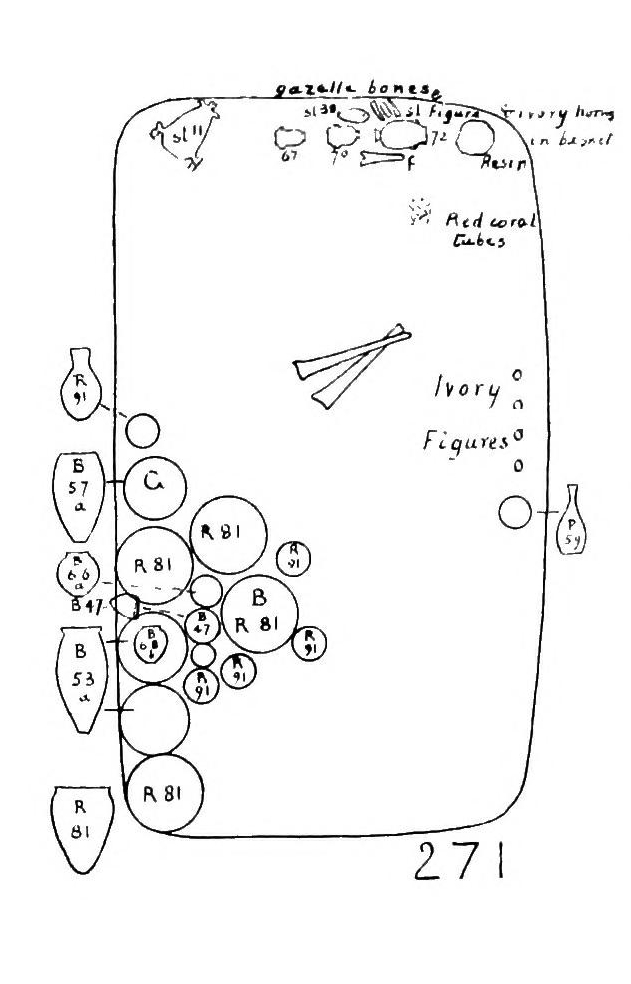
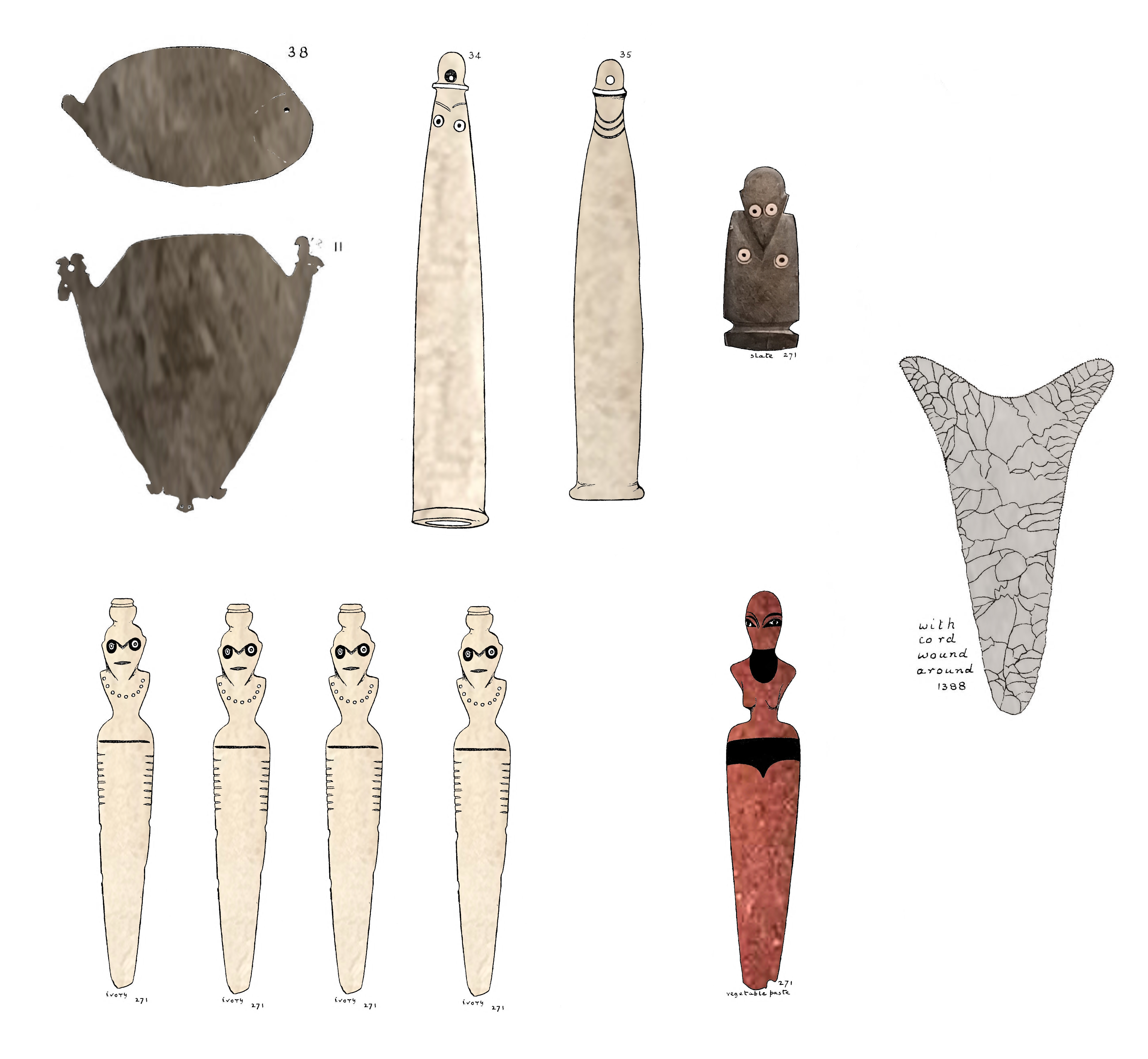
Tomb 271, a large rectangular grave, with artifacts (Naqada IIB).

The other type of tombs in Naqada were wealthy graves, such as Tomb T5, Tomb T4 from the elite Cemetery T at Naqada, or Tomb 271, all dated to the Naqada IIA-IIC period. Contrary to the usual Egyptian graves placed in caves or hollows, these tomb belonged to a different category: they were deep and rectangular, formed from a vertical pit and were roofed. These wealthy graves were roofed over with beams and brushwood, a system not seen in standard Egyptian tombs. These tombs were quite large and well furnished, and were built for the elite of the period. The artifacts in the tomb were precious and well-manufactured, including pottery, jewelry, status symbols, cosmetic palettes. These tombs usually contained detached skulls and bodies, often arranged in heaps. In some tombs, there is evidence of one man accompanied in death by several females, suggesting a sacrifice of concubines or servants attending the deceased. Such practice is characteristic of later royal burials at Abydos. These tomb were usually furnished with large jars, some of them filled with organic materials, including possibly beer and scented fats, probably offerings. Finely-polished stone vases, made of diorite and breccia, were positioned among the skulls. The pottery of these high-level tomb consisted exclusively of Fancy-form (F-ware), Wavy-handled (W-ware) and multiple Rough-ware vessels. Many of the bodies discovered in these tombs were mutilated or decapitated, suggesting either ritual practices or even ritual cannibalism.

Artificial mummification was already practiced from around 3500 BC in Hierakonpolis, where traces of resin and linen wrappings were discovered.

== Transitional bearded tusk statuettes (End Naqada I- Early Naqada II) ==
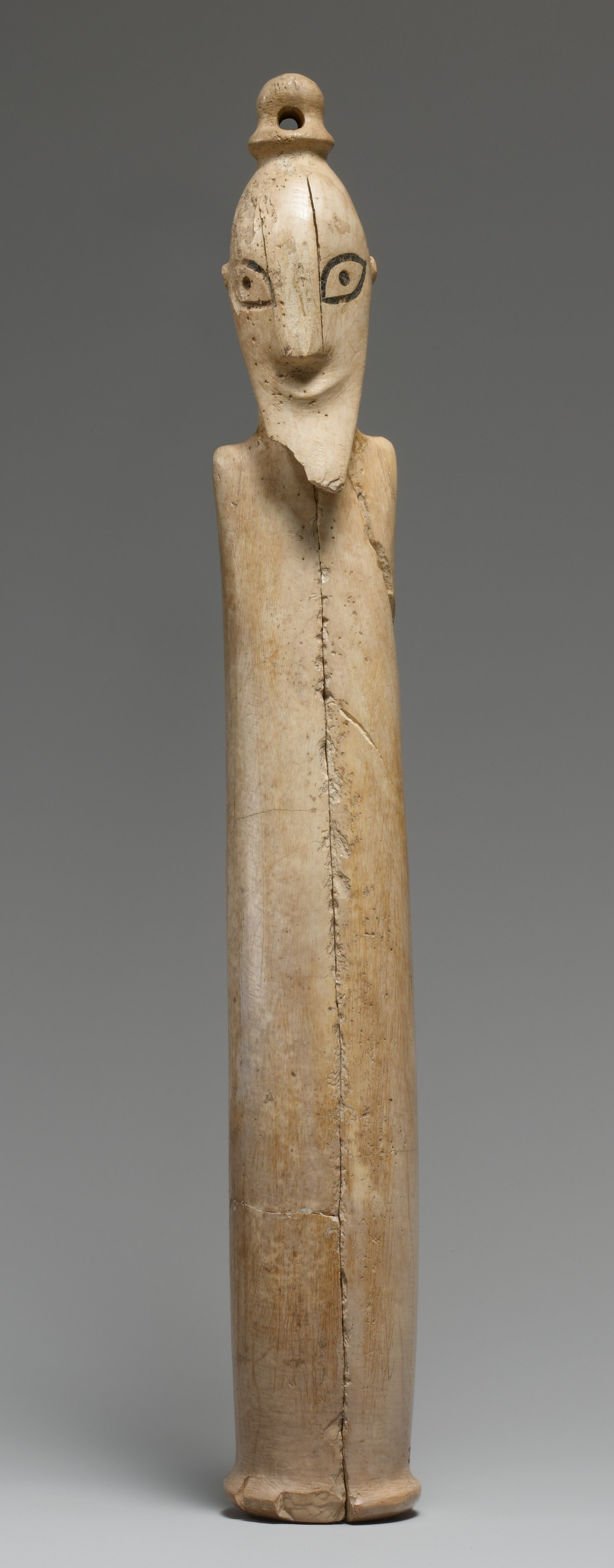
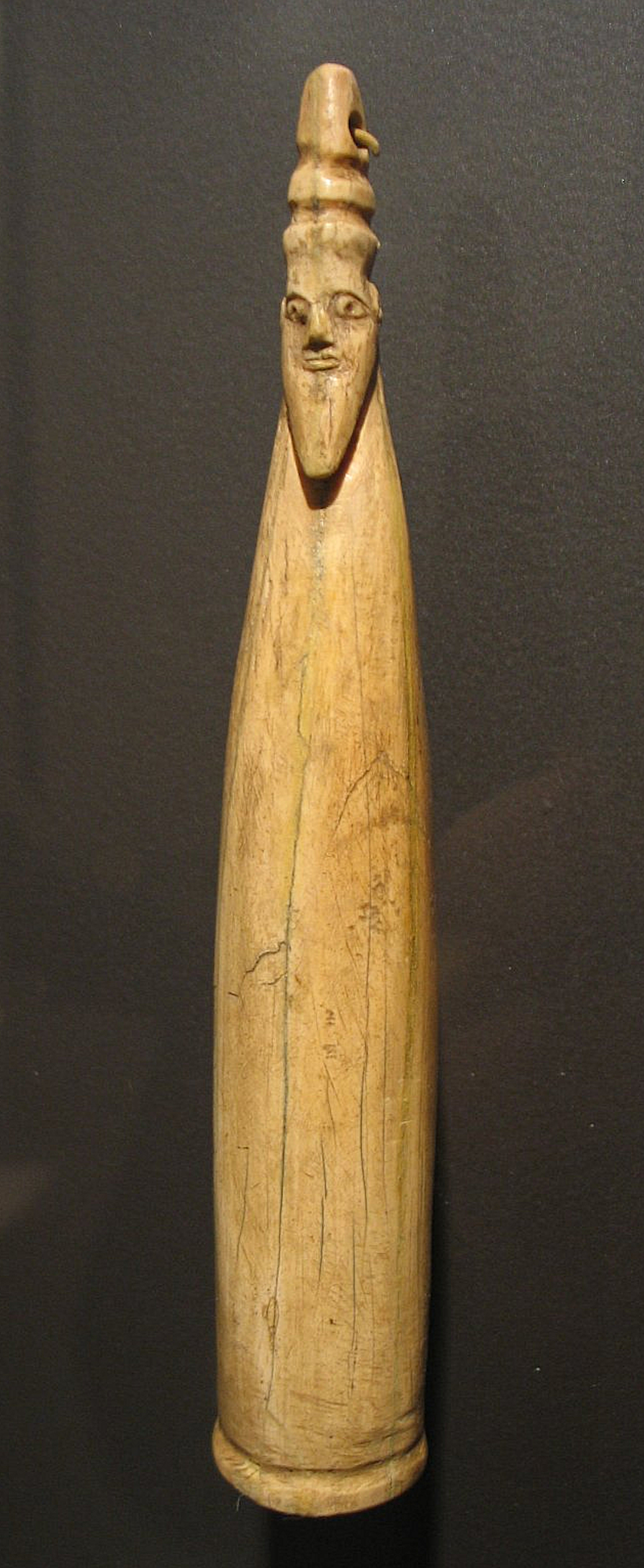
Hippopotamus tusks with carved head, 3900–3500 BCE, Naqada I–II. Metropolitan Museum of Art and Brooklyn Museum.

Many figurines are known which have pointed beards, with often some traces of hair, and sometimes tall hats. They are carved on hippopotamus tusks or ivory tags. Datation is uncertain, but the earliest ones are securely dated from the end of Naqada I, and they continue into Naqada II, but none of these anthropomorphic tusks are attested in the Late Pre-Dynastic, i.e. Naqada III.

Anthropomorphic tusks are only found in Upper Egypt, most of the time in tombs and rarely in settlements, and most of them before Naqada IID. In 1895, Flinders Petrie excavated several anthropomorphic tusks in Naqada, which he always found in pairs, one solid and one hollow to half of its length, in total eight pairs of anthropomorphic tusks found in eight different graves from the Naqada cemetery, including the tomb of a woman. Petrie also obtained several other anthropomorphic tusks on the antiquity market in Egypt. Petrie initially dated these bearded statuettes to SD 33-45 (mid-Naqada I to Naqada IIB) on stylistic grounds, and later to SD 38, the earliest stage of Naqada II. A wider date range between Naqada I and Naqada IID has been suggested by Hendrickx (2016).

The figures seem to be wearing clothing, and may represent people dressed in long cloaks. Bearded men also appear in many other pre-dynastic artifacts, such as the Gebel el-Arak Knife. The headgear of the Mesopotamian-style "Lord of Animals" on the Gebel el-Arak knife may also be comparable to the torus-shaped headgear visible on many of the Naqada I figurines.

Tusks with human heads are of two types, depending on their sizes: smaller ones, made from the canine teeth of the hippopotamus, and larger ones, made from the lower incisors. Most have a knob-like headdress, which is often pierced. The authenticity of these bearded tusk statuettes is generally considered beyond doubt. Some of the statuettes originally obtained by Petrie, and now in the Musées de Bruxelles, were analyzed forensically, and their authenticity confirmed. Two other datable pieces excavated from Badari by Guy Brunton (tomb 3165 and tomb 3828), include one similar tusk surmounted by a bearded face in relief, which is securely attributed to SD 37-38 (Naqada IC-IIA).

Men with beards never appear other than in sculptural works, neither in the victory and hunting scenes on White Cross-lined pottery nor in the Decorated potteries with males accompanying women raising their arms.

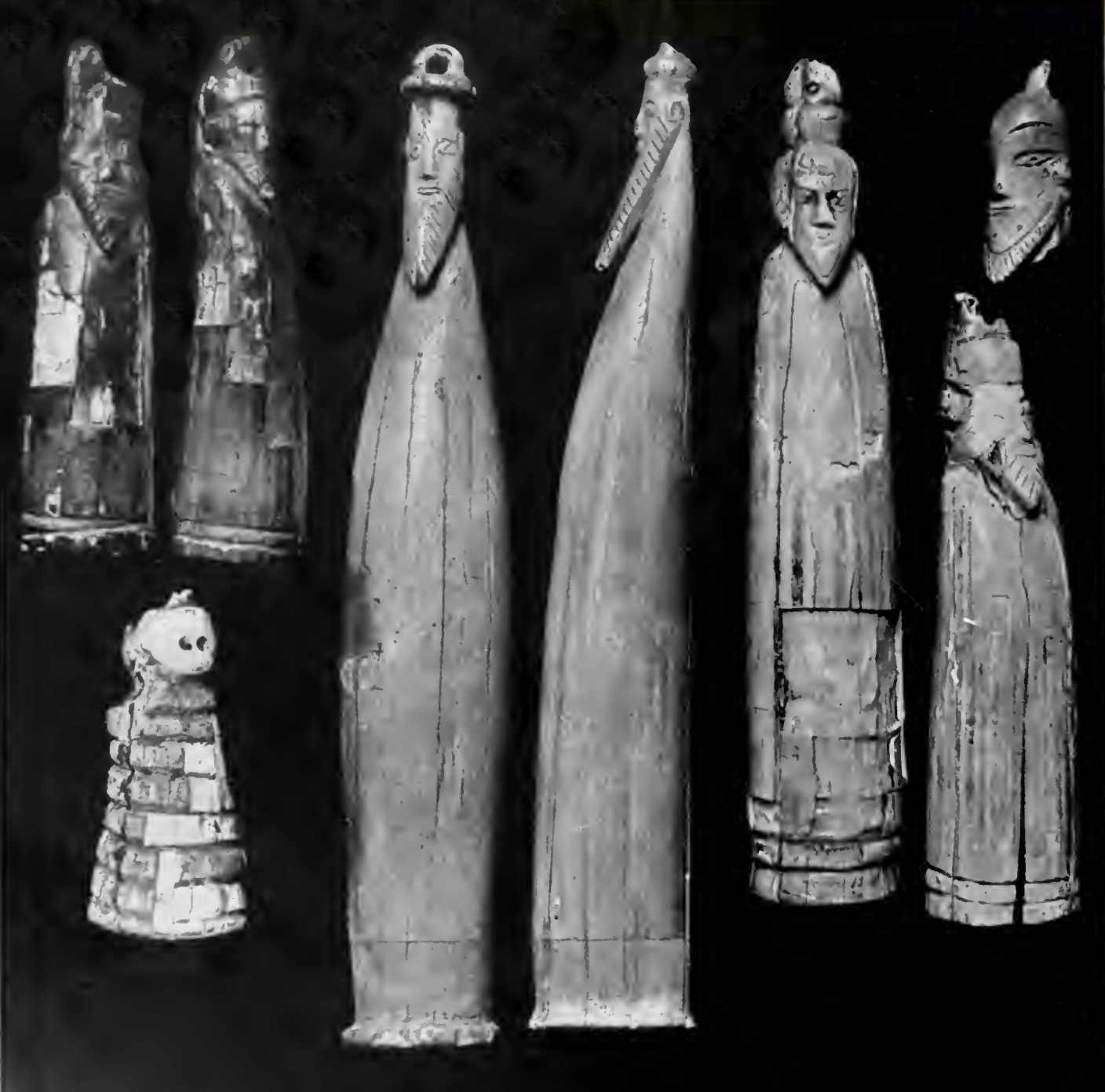
Bearded tusk statuettes, Naqada II. University College, London.

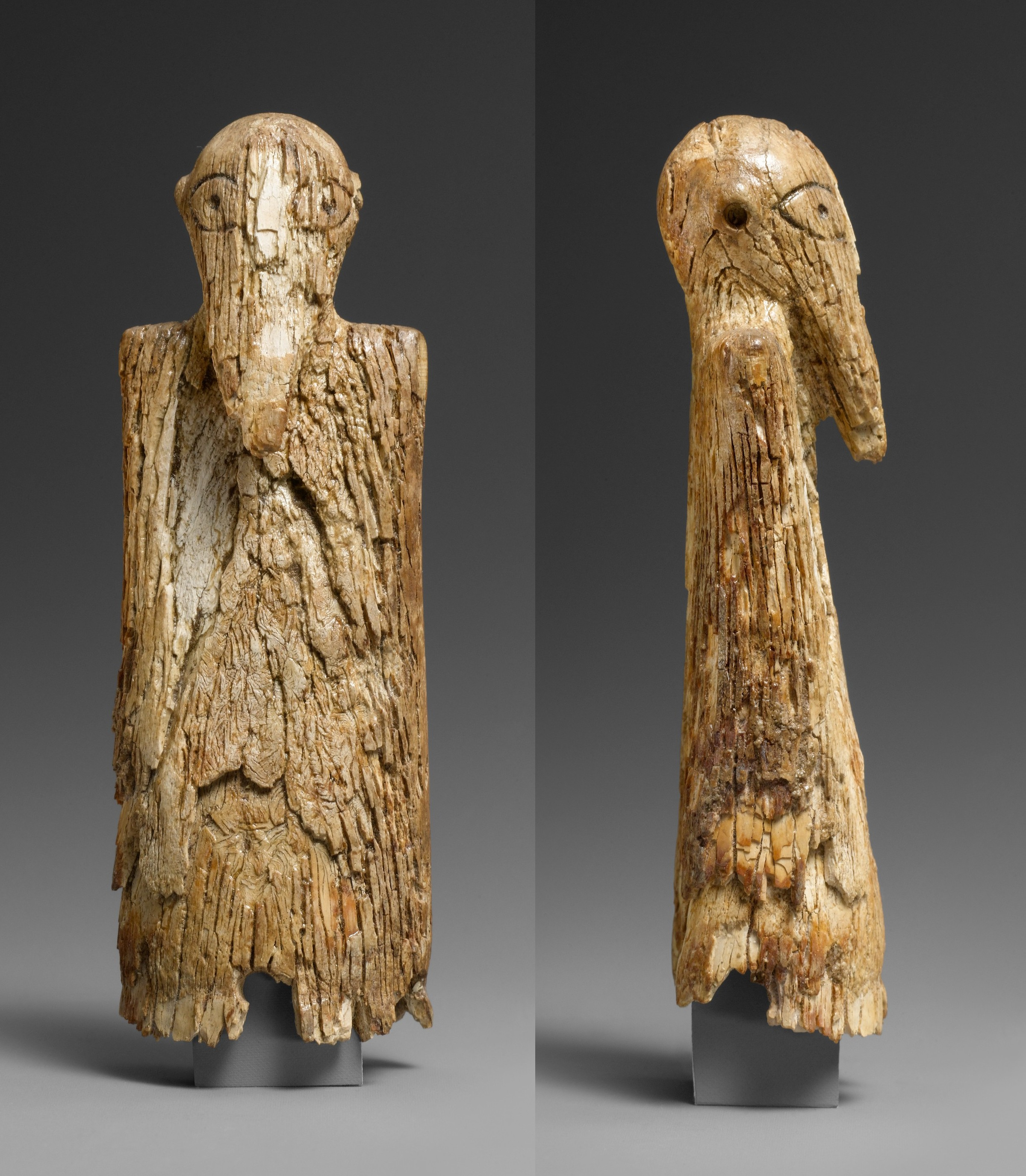
Male figurine, hippopotamus ivory tusk, Egypt 3650–3300 BCE, Naqada II. Metropolitan Museum of Art.

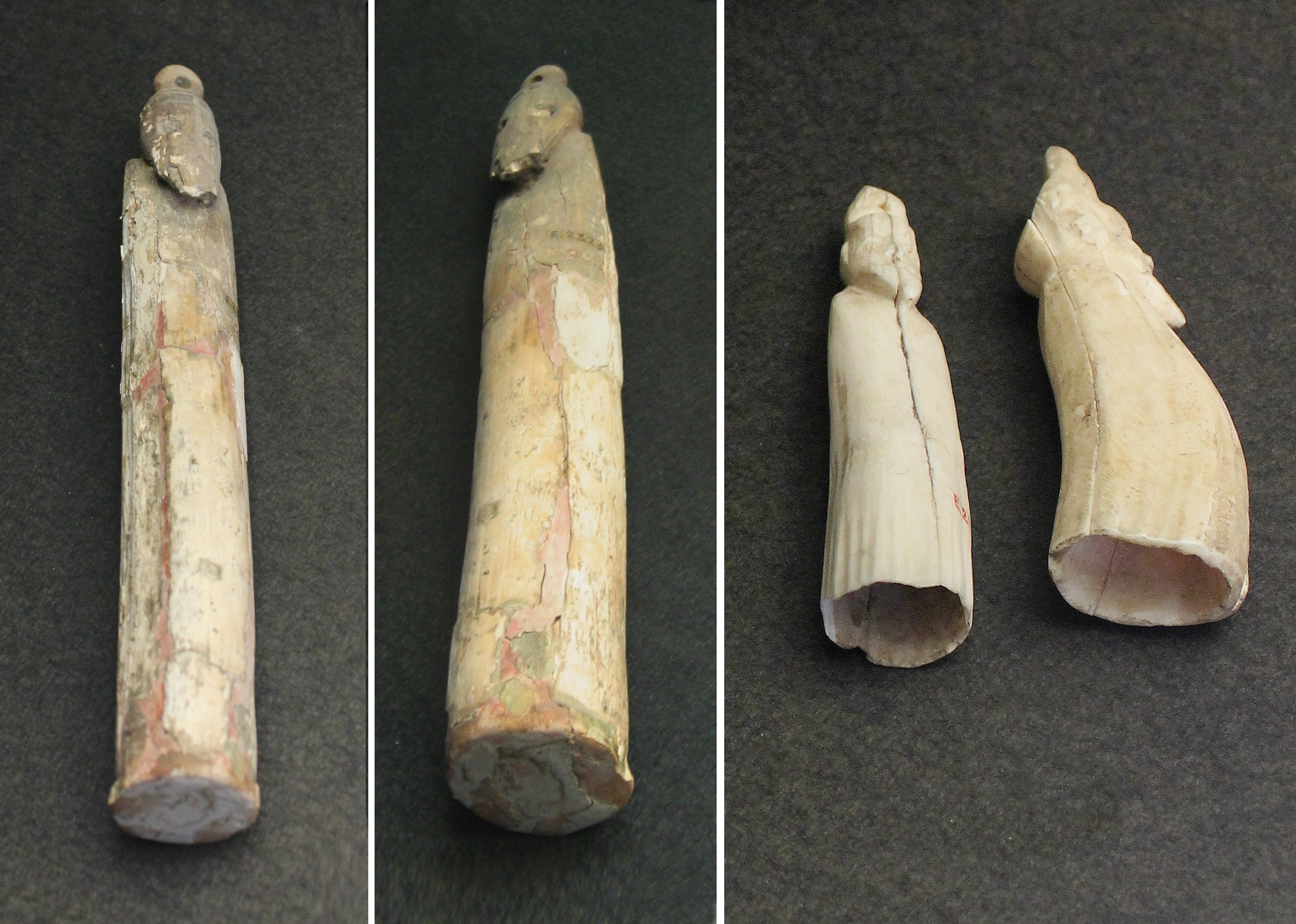
Ivory bearded figurines, large and small. Naqada. Royal Museums of Art and History, Brussels.

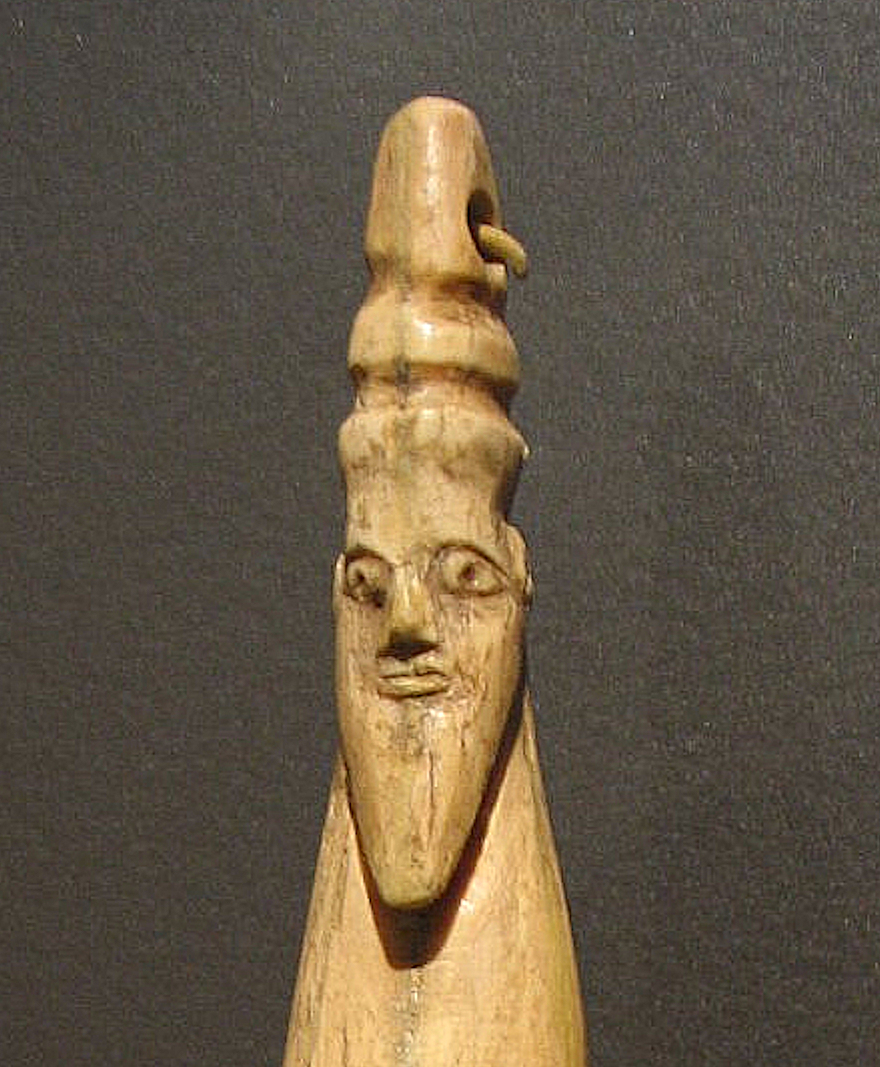
Hippopotamus tusk with carved head of a bearded man with torus-like headgear, Late Naqada I – Early Naqada II, 3800–3400 BC. Brooklyn Museum.

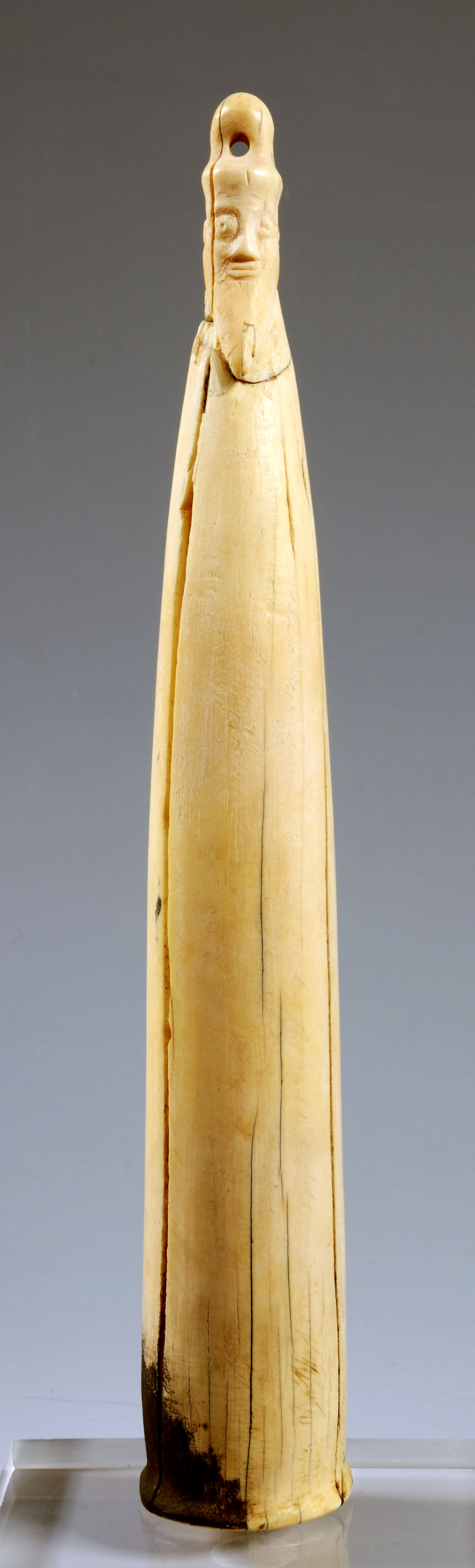
Tusk carved in the form of a bearded man, 3900-3500 BC. Museo Egizio, Turin.

== Naqada IIA and IIB (c.3500 BC) ==
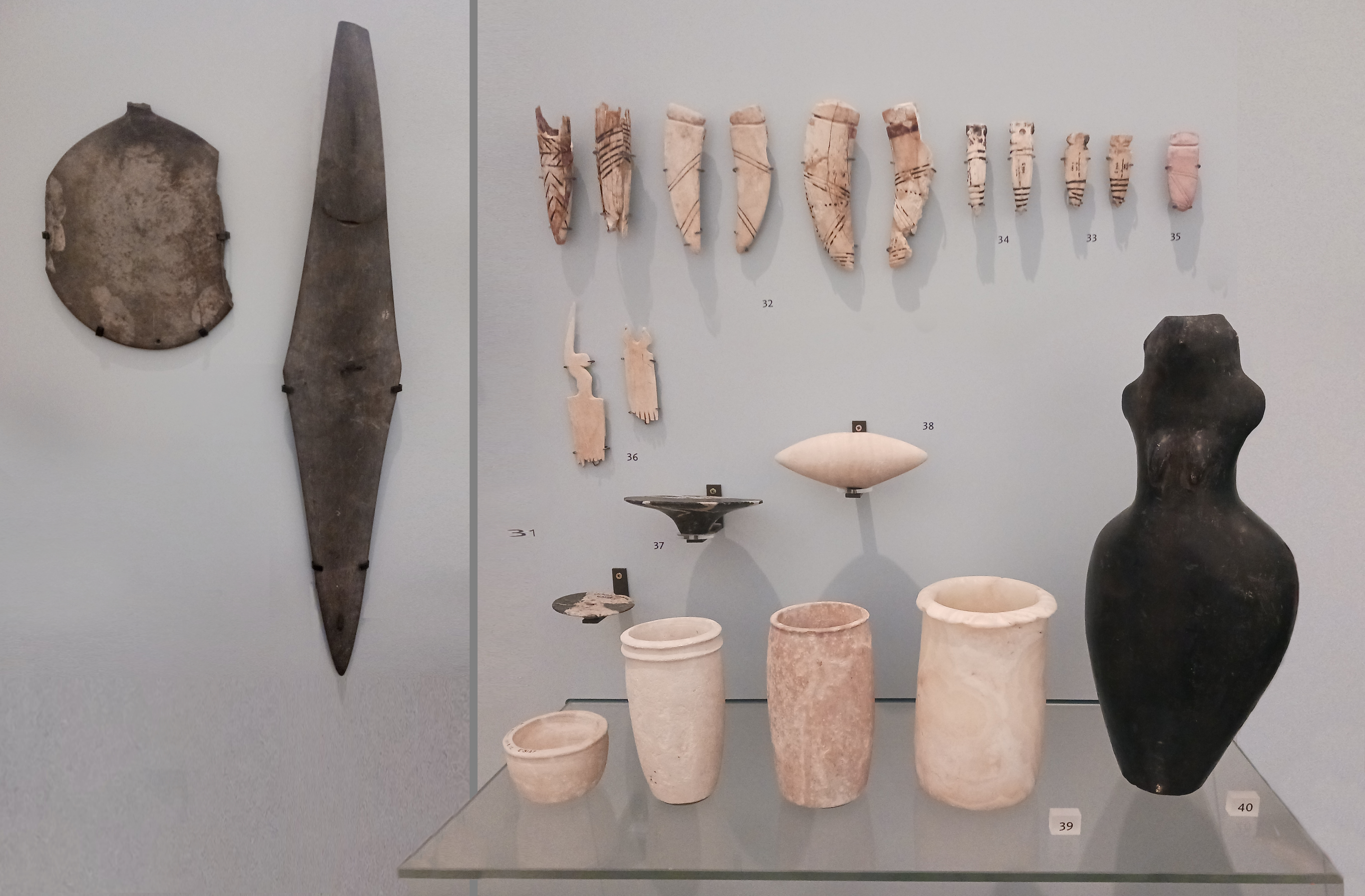
A Naqada IIA burial assemblage (SD 33-41), with stone palettes, ivory tags and tusks, female statuette, and stone vessels (Grave B102, Abadiya). Ashmolean Museum

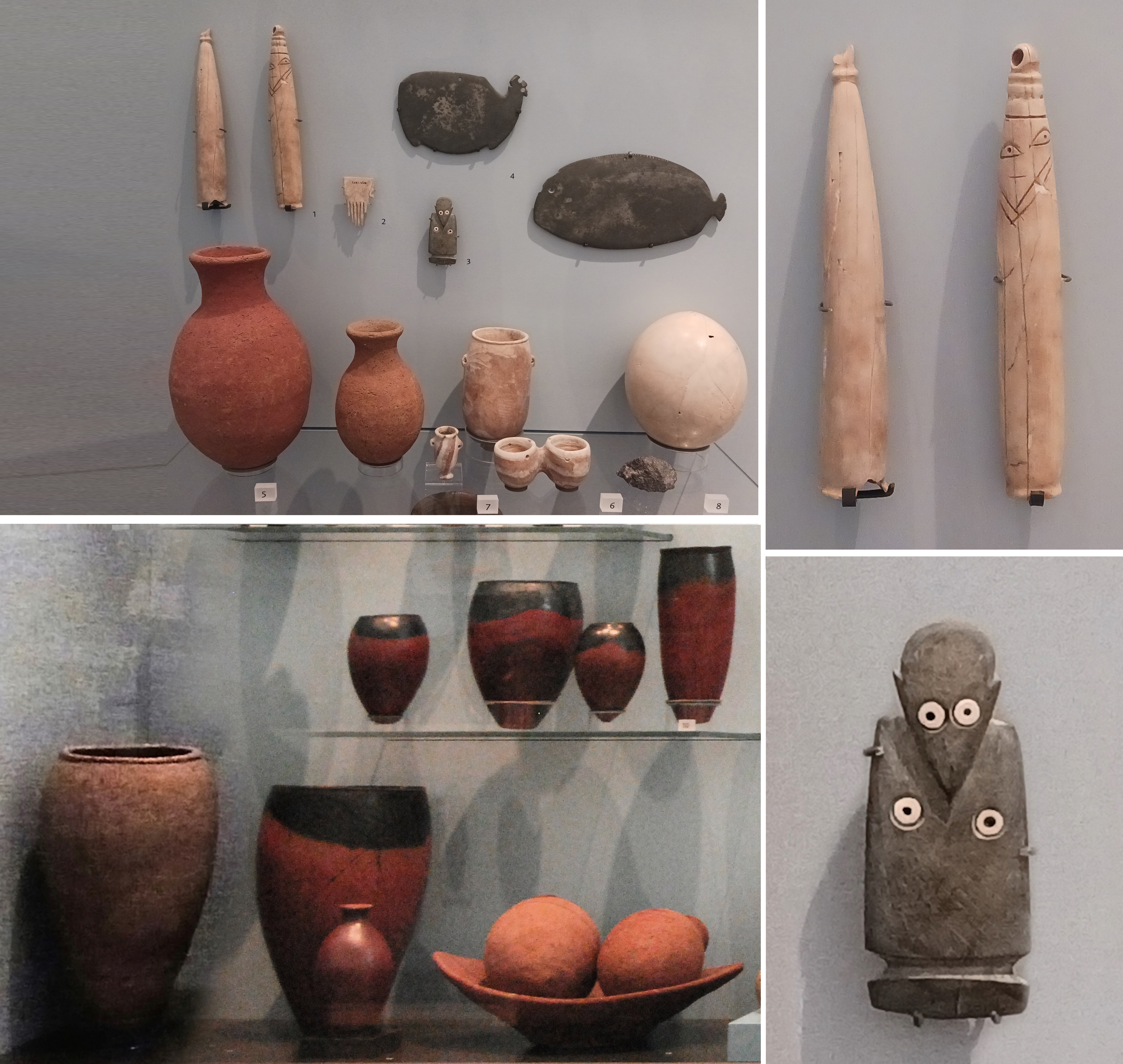
A Naqada IIB burial assemblage, with anthropomorphic tusks and tags, animal palettes, stoneware and pottery (Tomb T4, Naqada). This is a grave formed from a vertical pit. Ashmolean Museum

The period of Naqada IIA and Naqada IIB see the appearance of early forms of artifacts that would become characteristic of the later Naqada period: ivory tusks and tags with designs of bearded men start to appear, as well as simple designs of cosmetic palettes in the shape of rhomboids or animals.

In the area of pottery, black-topped red pottery continued to be produced, while white cross-lined pottery ("C-ware") started to disappear, before vanishing completely and being replaced by decorative "D" ware from the Naqada IIC period. Rough pottery (type "R") also started to appear during this period.

Known Naqada IIA and IIB cemeteries occupy a rather limited geographical area and are essentially located in the area around Naqada, including the cemeteries of Matmar, Salmany, Naqada and Armant.

Trading relations between Upper Egypt and south-western Asia may have started during this time, centered around the mineral wealth of the eastern desert, particularly gold. Traders may have arrived through the Red Sea or through the Nile Delta, which they seem to have bypassed for lack of local precious resources. Such trade may have stimulated urban and state development in Upper Egypt.

=== Vessels ===
Naqada II continued to use large quantities of Black-top redware, especially present in the burials of Naqada IIA and IIB, such as Abadiya grave B101 or B102. Globally, the Naqada IIA and IIB are characterized by the fact that White Cross-Lined ware (Polished red body with white painting, "C-ware") gradually disappears, while Rough ware (a new type of pottery with vegetal particles which burn upon firing and create an uneven surface, "R-ware") emerges, and Polished Red ware (red polished pottery, "P-wares") become more diverse.

One of the originalities of the period is that figures in relief started to be incorporated into Black-top redware. A remarkable fragment from this period appears to have the motif of the Red Crown, of which it is considered as the first known depiction. The symbol of the Red Crown has been known historically as the regnal symbol of Lower Egypt, but it seems that it originated in Upper Egypt, where it was the crown worn by the rulers of Naqada.

Other wares were used in lesser quantities, such as Rough ware (type "R") a new type of pottery with vegetal particles which burn upon firing and create an uneven surface, or Polished Red ware.

Some beautiful and precious stone vessels were also manufactured, such as the red and white limestone vessels of Naqada Tomb T4 (Naqada IIB).

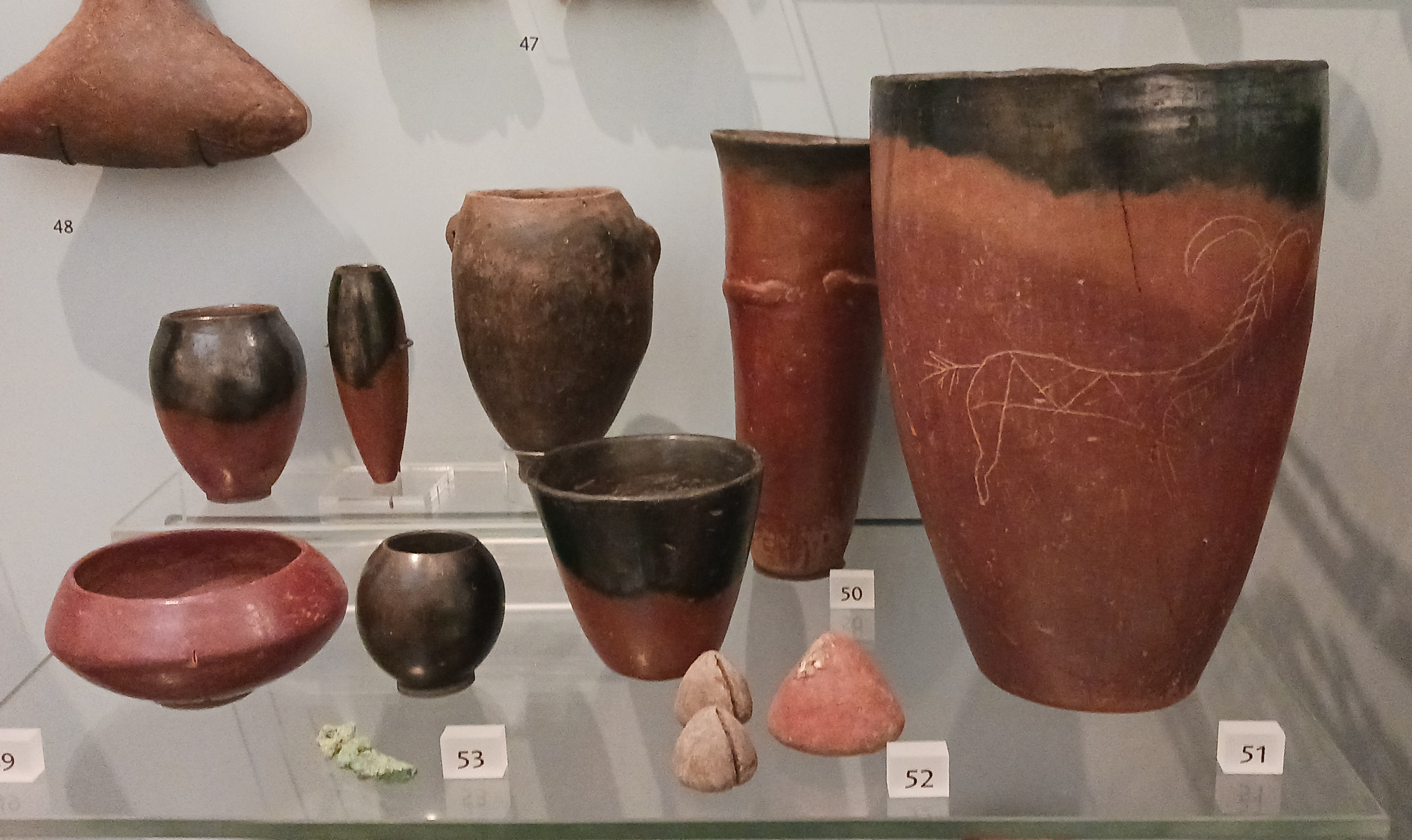
Vessels in a Naqada IIA burial (Abadiya grave B101)

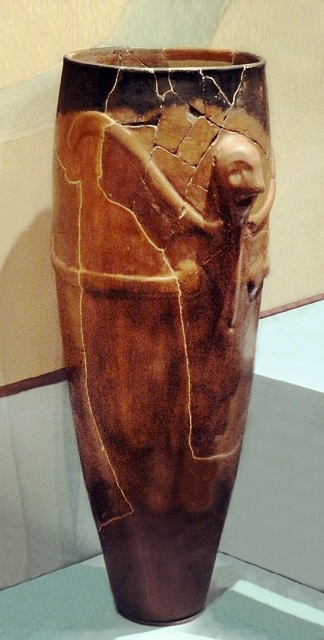
Vessel with individual raising arms. 3650 BC, Naqada IIA.

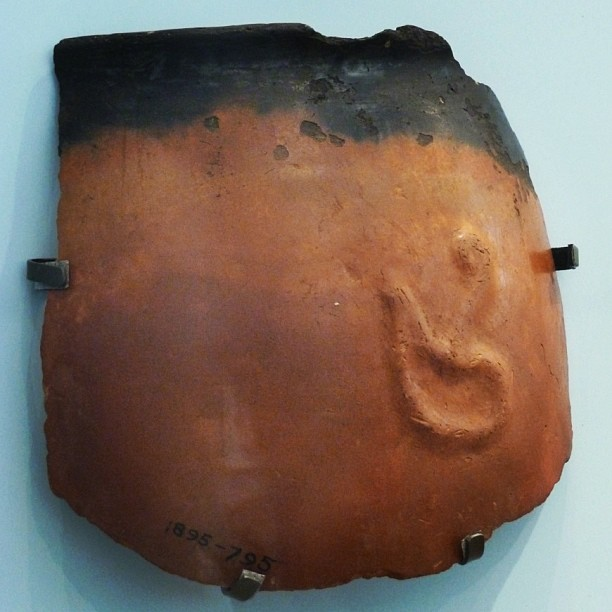
Vase fragment decorated with a Red Crown, regnal symbol of Naqada, and later Lower Egypt. Naqada IIA.

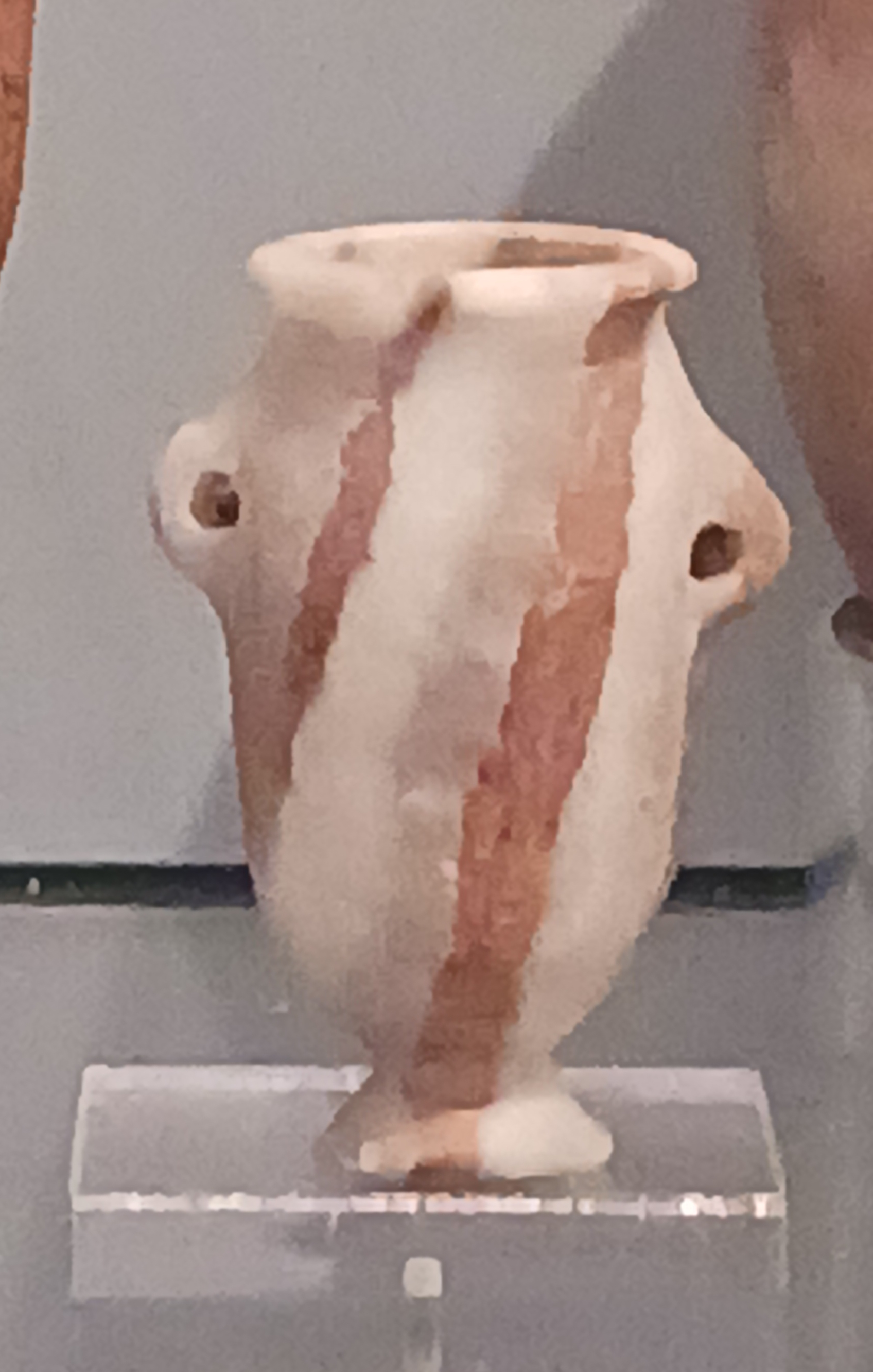
A multicolor stone vessel: red and white limestone jar. Naqada Tomb T4. Naqada IIB.

=== Ivory and stone anthropomorphic figures ===
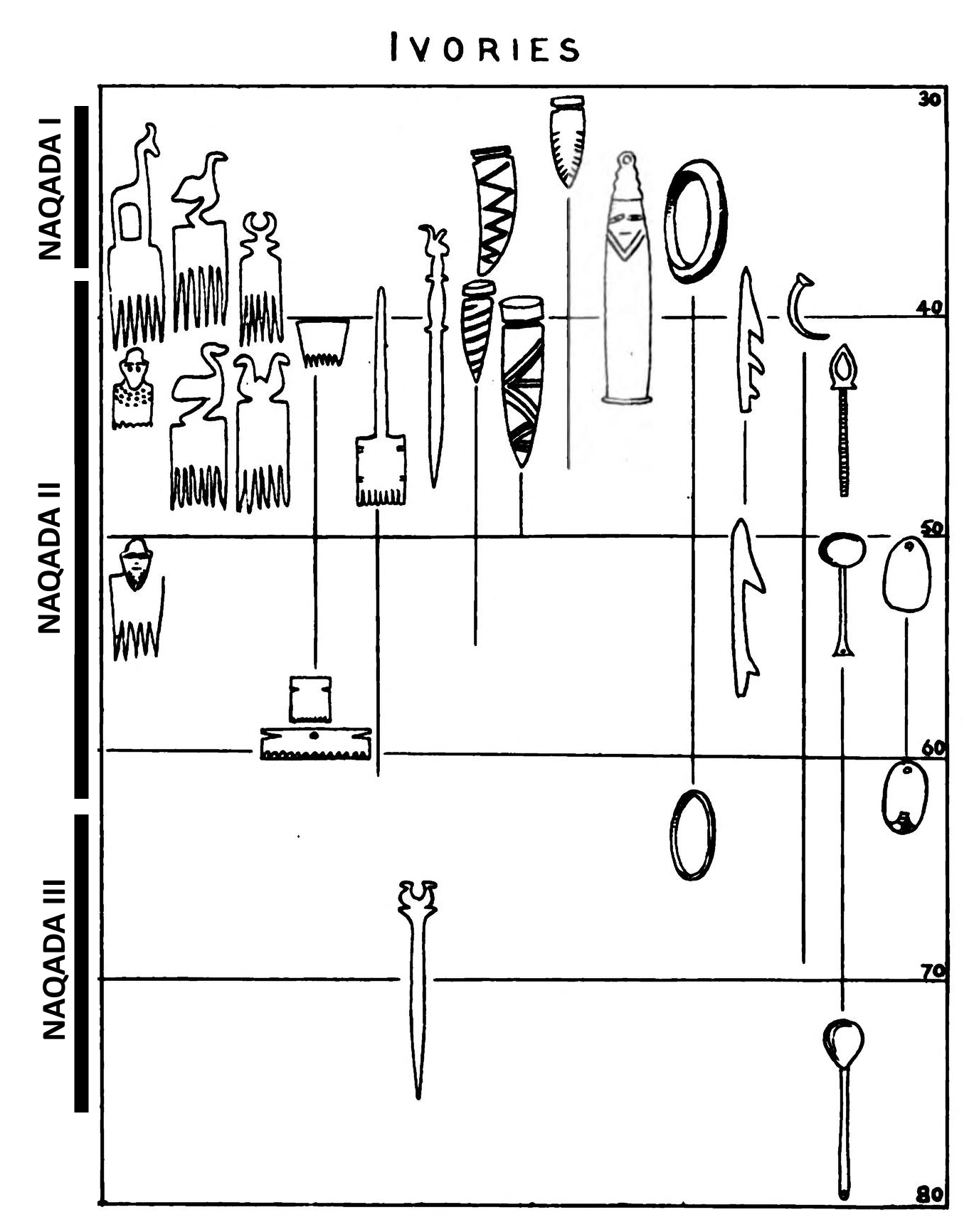
Naqada period ivories.

Many anthropomorphic ivory tags showing bearded individuals have also been were found in Naqada graves dated to the Naqada IC-IIA period, with only a few specimens in Naqada IIB, and essentially none after. These have been found in the same graves as anthropomorphic tusk and simple animal ivory tags, indicating contemporaneity between these objects (for example Tomb 271, Naqada).

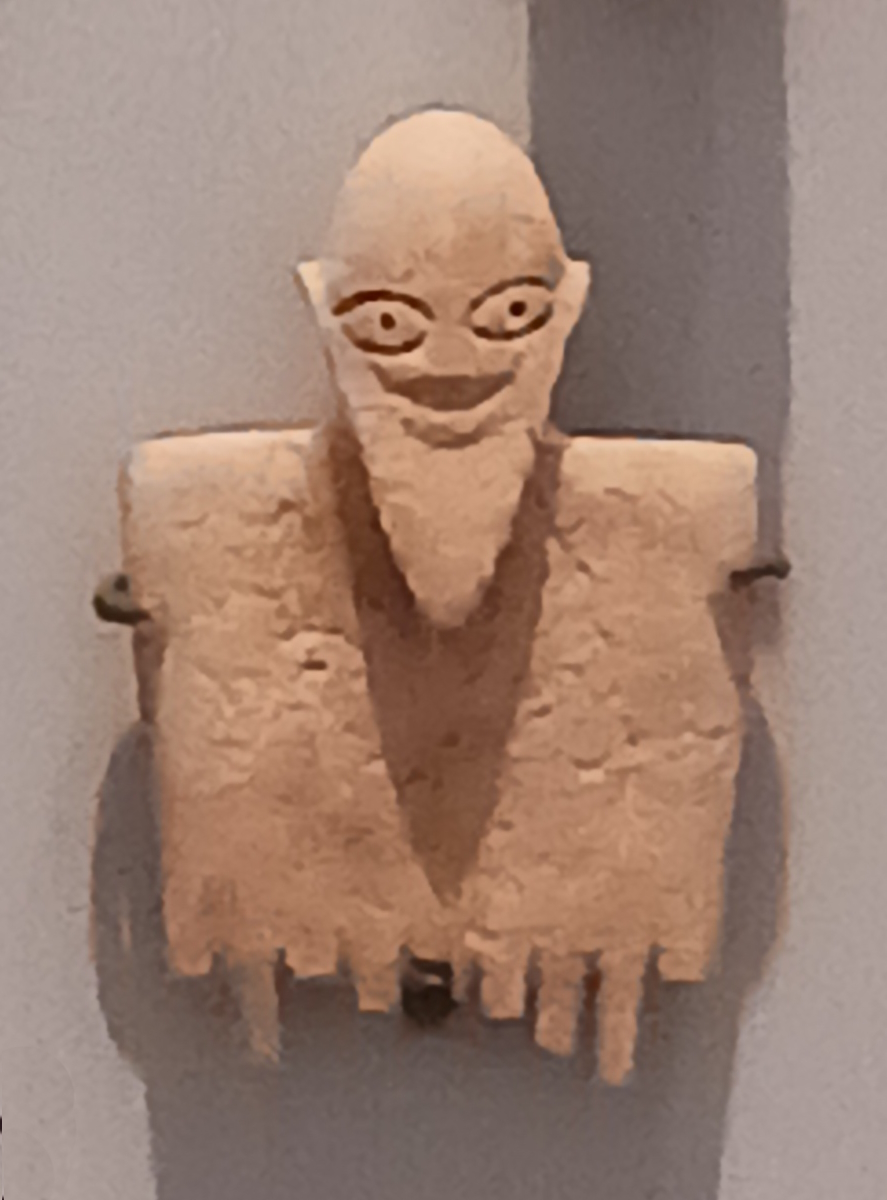
Ivory comb with human portrait. Naqada IIA. Naqada, Tomb 268. Ashmolean Museum.

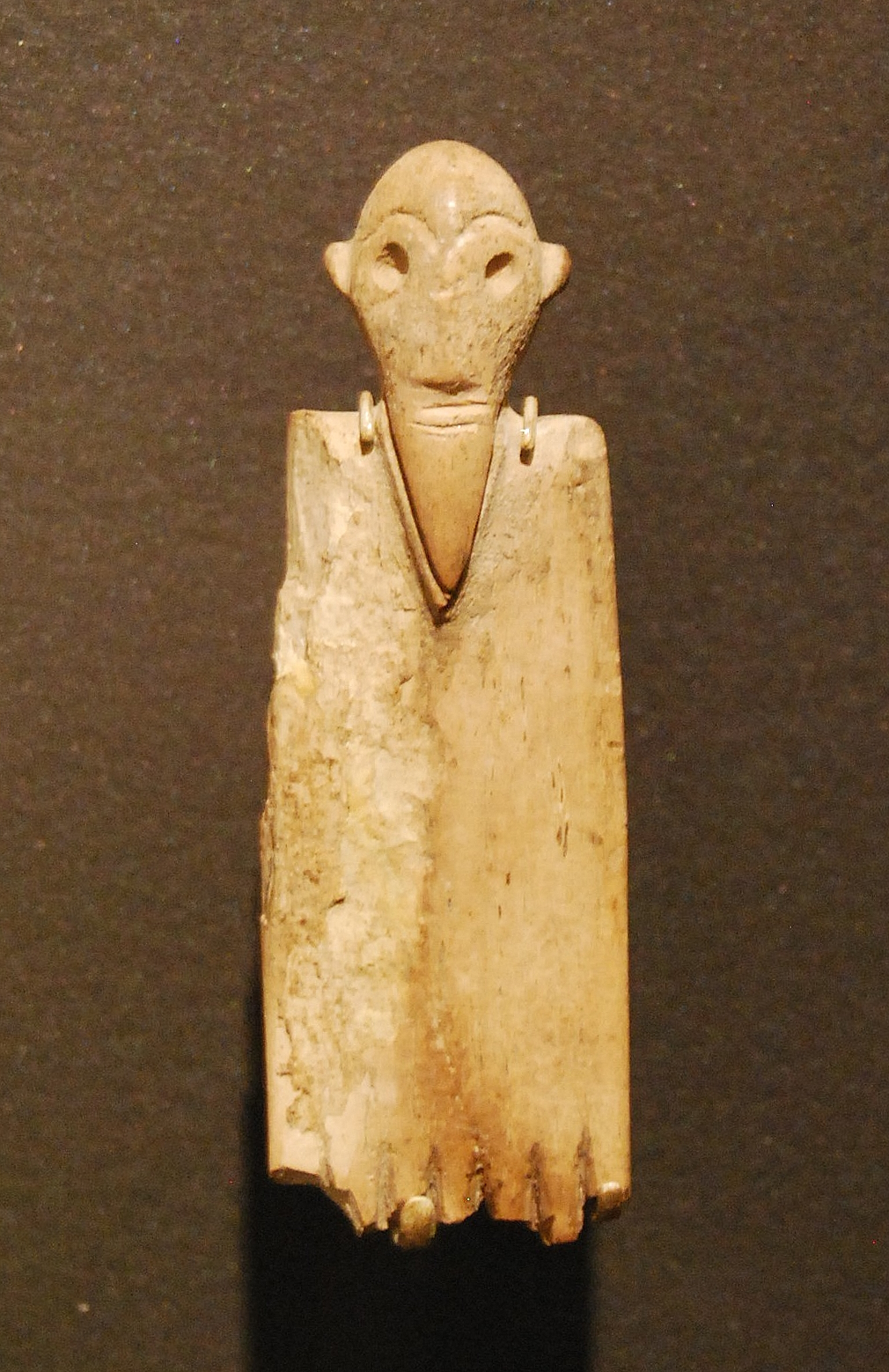
Comb with human image, Early Naqada II, 3500-3400 BC, Brooklyn Museum

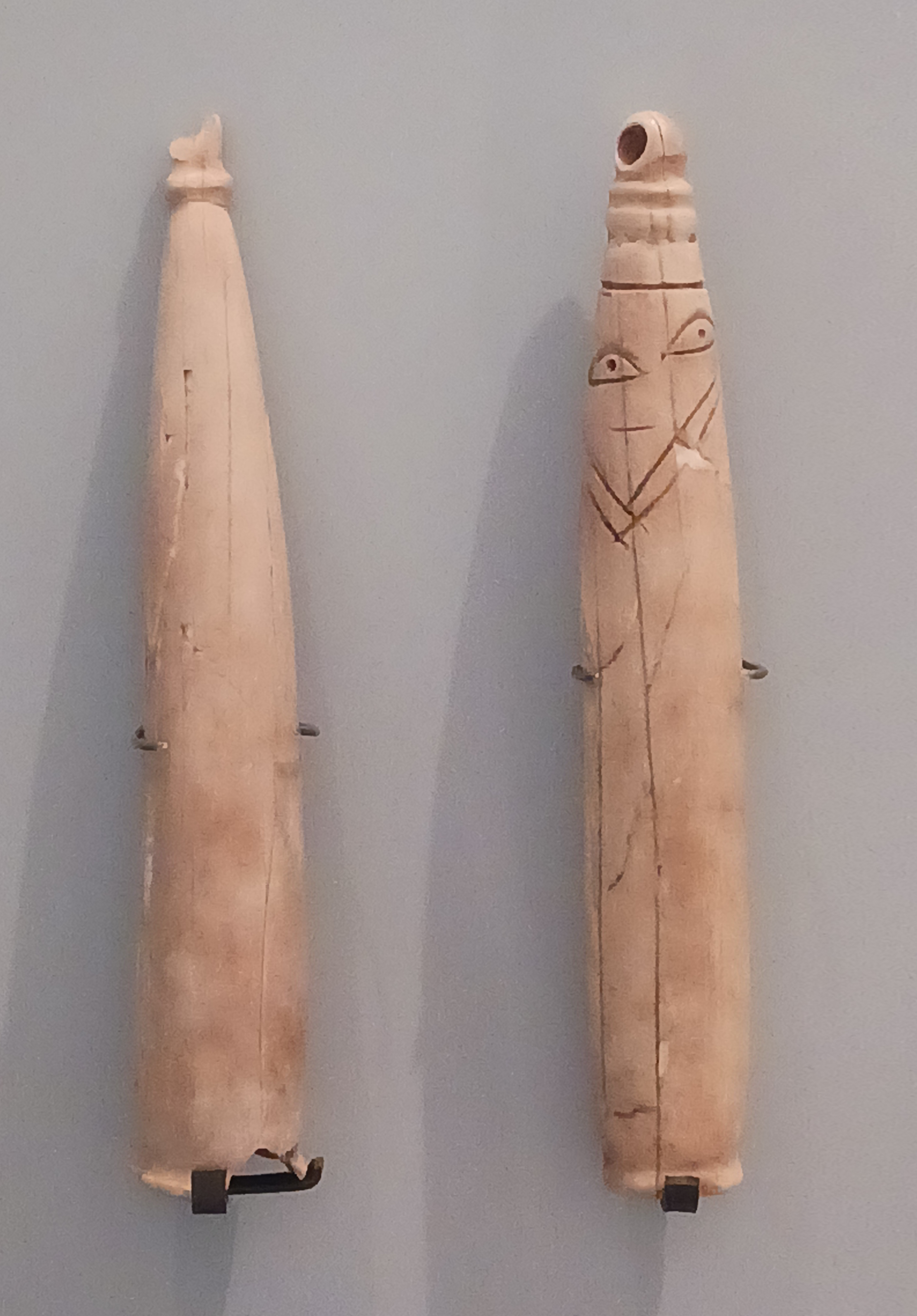
Ivory tusks, left one hollow, right one plain with bearded face design. Naqada Tomb T4. Naqada IIB.

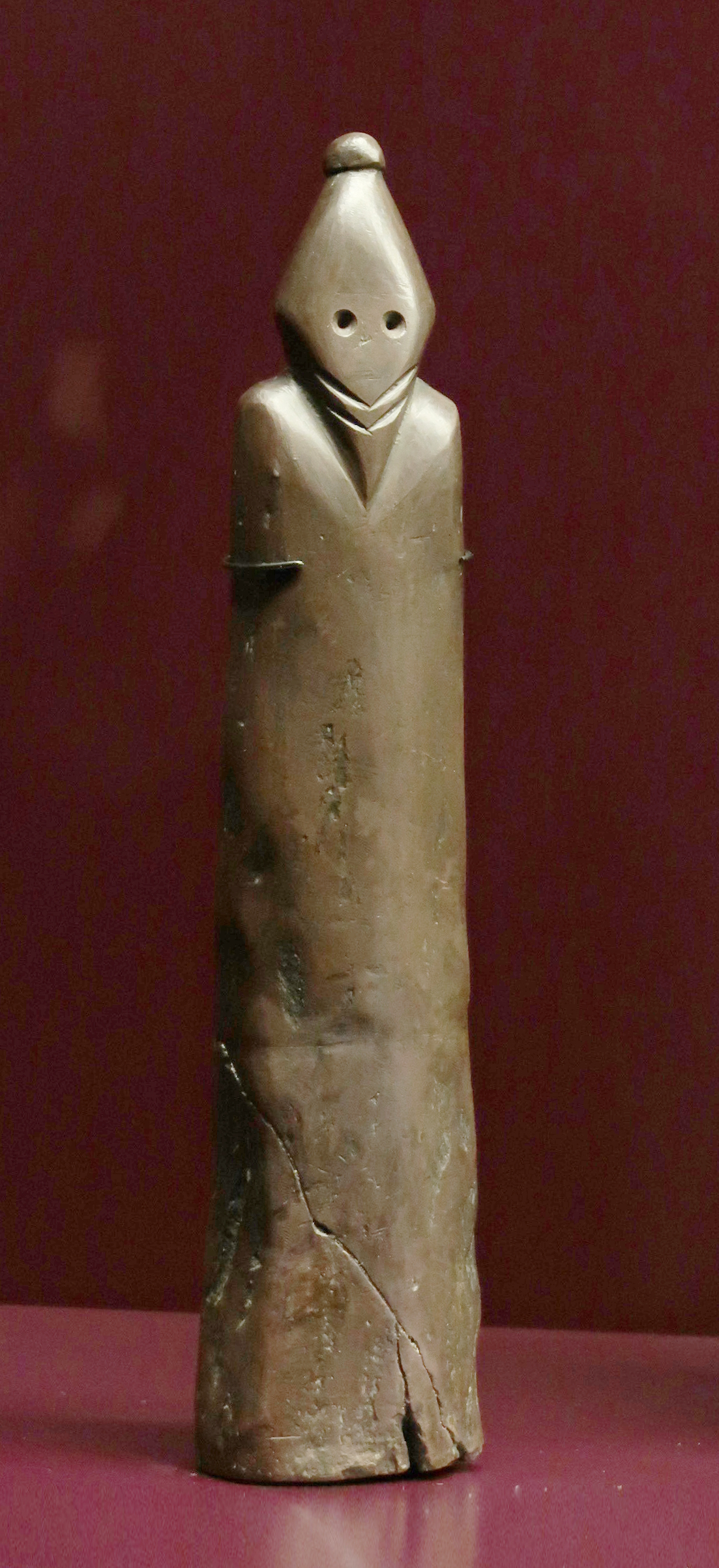
Stone statuette, Gebelein excavations (1909). Musée des Confluences. Naqada II.

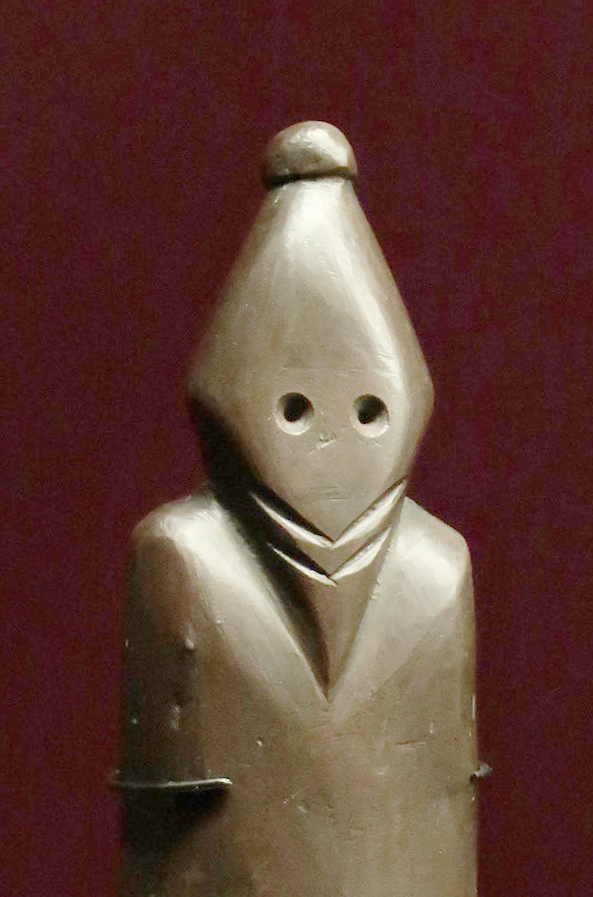
Head detail with possible incipient White Crown. Gebelein excavations (1909). Naqada II.

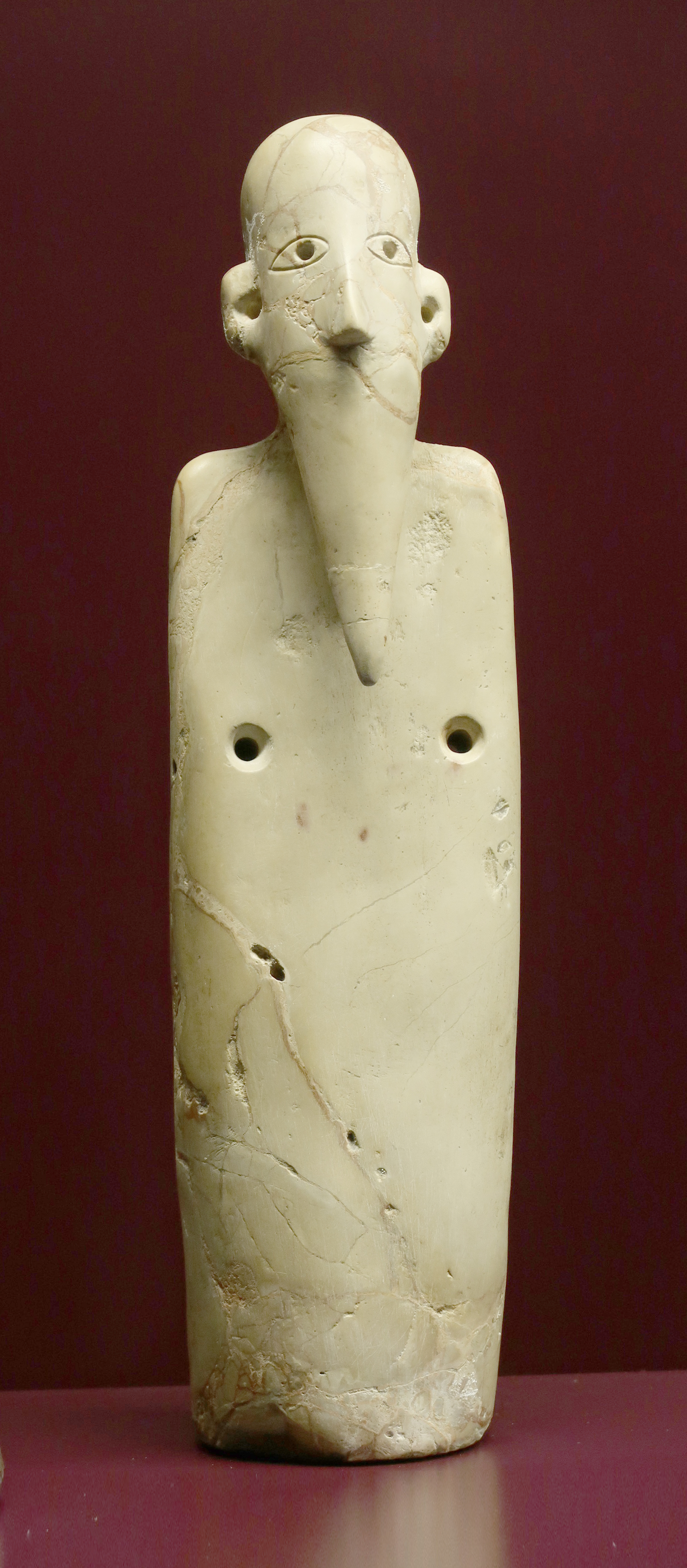
Breccia statuette. Gebelein excavations (1909), Musée des Confluences. Naqada II.

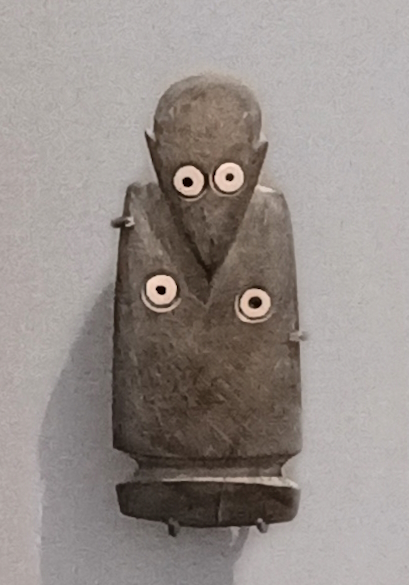
Tag in human shape, Tomb 271, Naqada. Naqada IIB, circa 3500 BC. Ashmolean Museum.

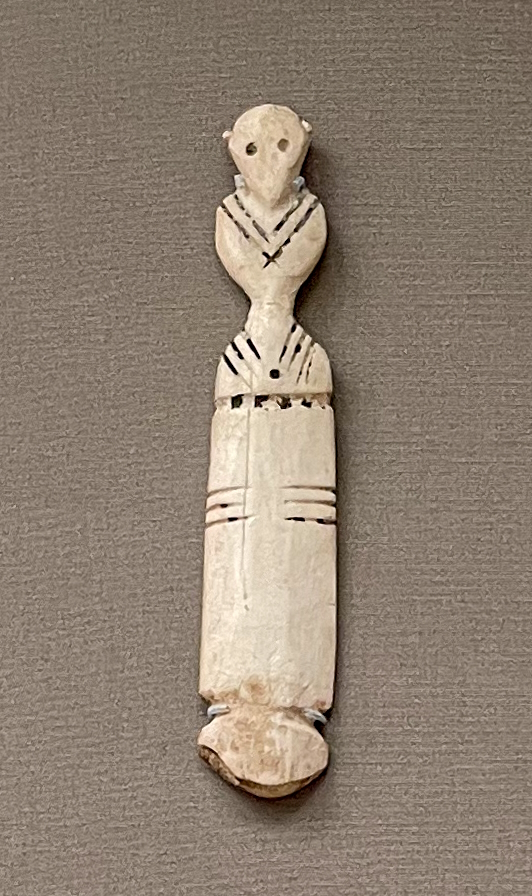
Tag with human form. Matmar 2682. Naqada IIB. EA63413

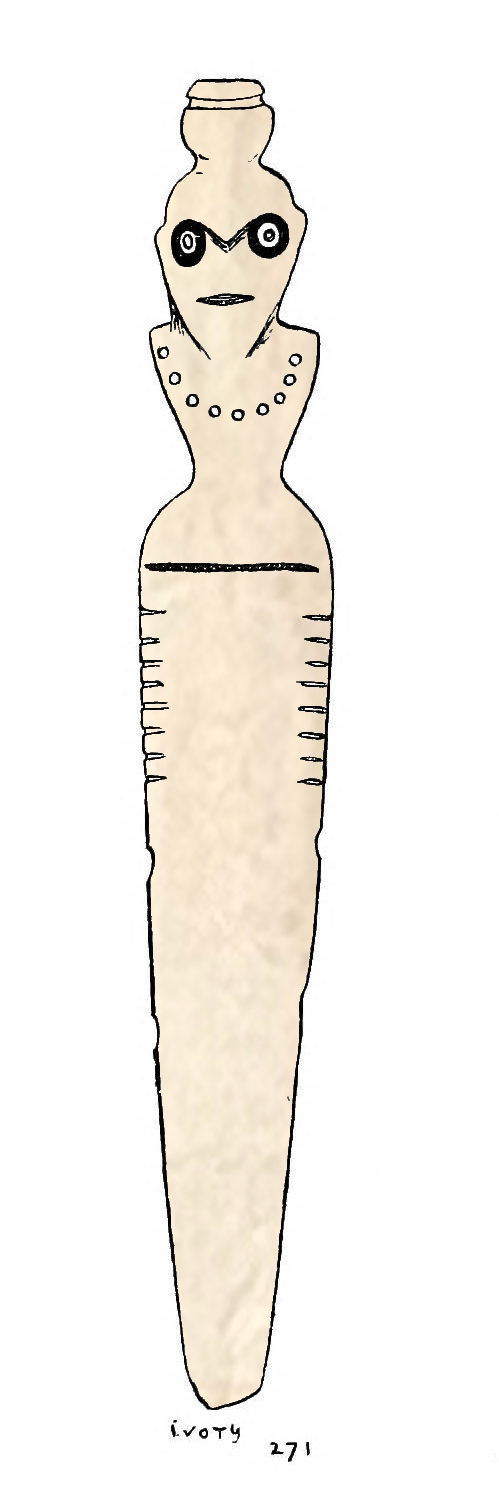
Ivory peg figurine, Tomb 271. Naqada IIB. Ashmolean Museum.

=== Clay figurines ===
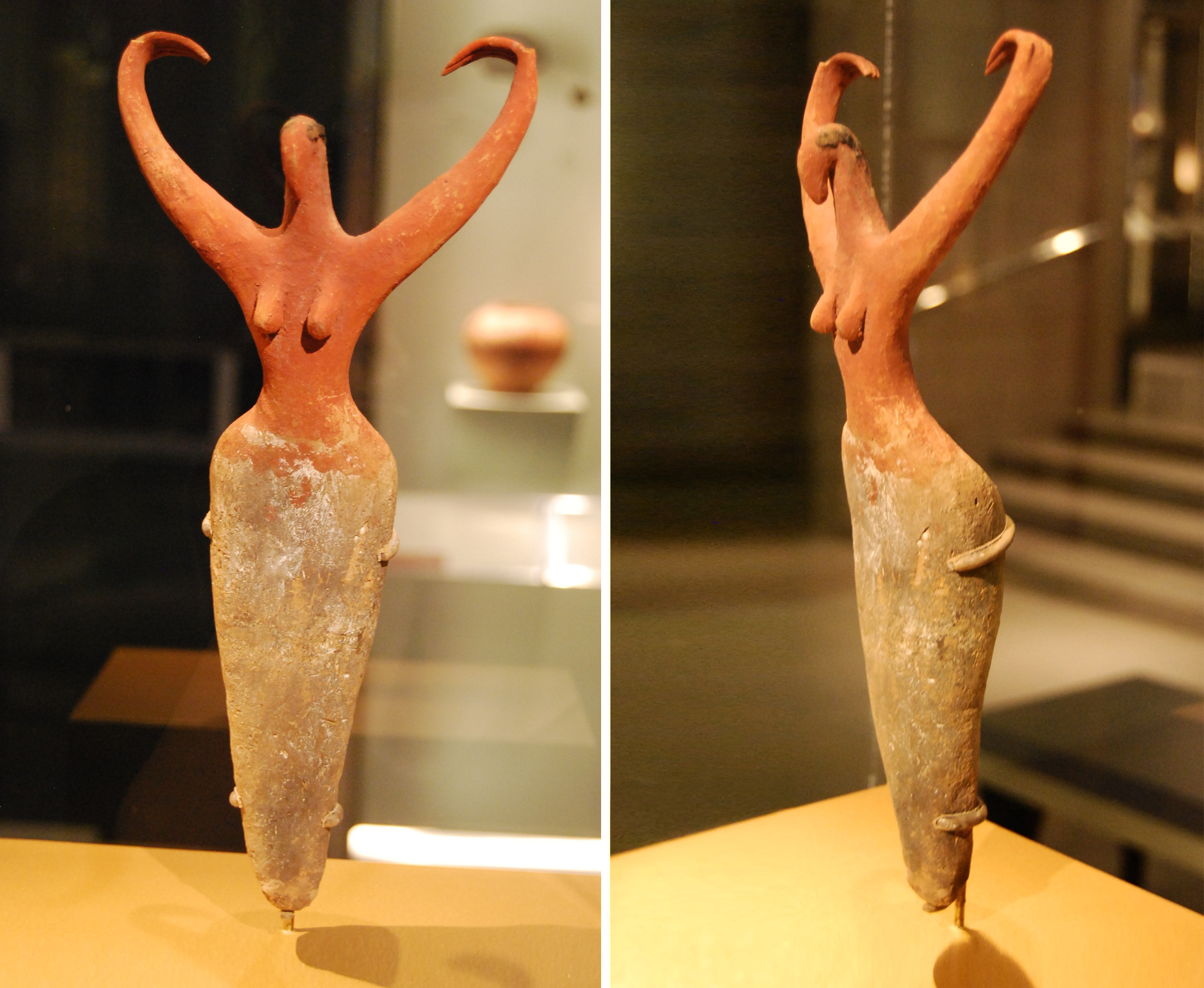
Female statuette, Tomb 2, El Ma’marîya. Naqada IIA, 3500-3400 BC. Brooklyn Museum. Also called the "Bird Lady". The legs are not articulated and the face is beaklike.

Various steatopygous female statuettes in dancing postures start to appear during Naqada IIA. Especially remarkable are the dancing Venuses holding their arms rounded above their heads in a seemingly dancing pause, or a pose of praise. Such statuettes may be wearing a fine skirt, signified by the joint legs design and the whitish coloration. Although these so-called "Bird Lady" are very slender and elegant bodies, the heads do not have realistic human proportions, and are rather bird-like, for uncertain reasons. The most famous of these statuettes, now in the Brooklyn Museum, was excavated by Henry de Morgan in 1909, from Tomb 2 at El Ma’marîya, a small oval tomb 1.3m deep, with the corpse in the traditional foetal position.

These female figures may be simply dancing. Alternatively the raised arms may imitate the horns of a cow, and the figures may be depictions of a deity, such as Hathor. This posture of raising arms over the head was already known from the Naqada I period, as it appears for some of the figures on Cross-lined pottery (C-ware), although they seem to be male, and seem to be in the act of dancing or celebrating a victory. Naqada II male statuettes (3650-3450 BC) with raised arms are also known.

Although statuettes essentially disappear from the archaeological record for Naqada IIC and IID, the theme of the woman with raised arms had a great longevity, and can be seen extensively in Naqada IIC Decorated pottery, or in the wall painting of Tomb 100 at Hierakonpolis.

Various clay statuettes of male figures are also known. They generally wear a large penile sheath to affirm their gender, and can be bird-like too, or more realistic, often with short curly hair.

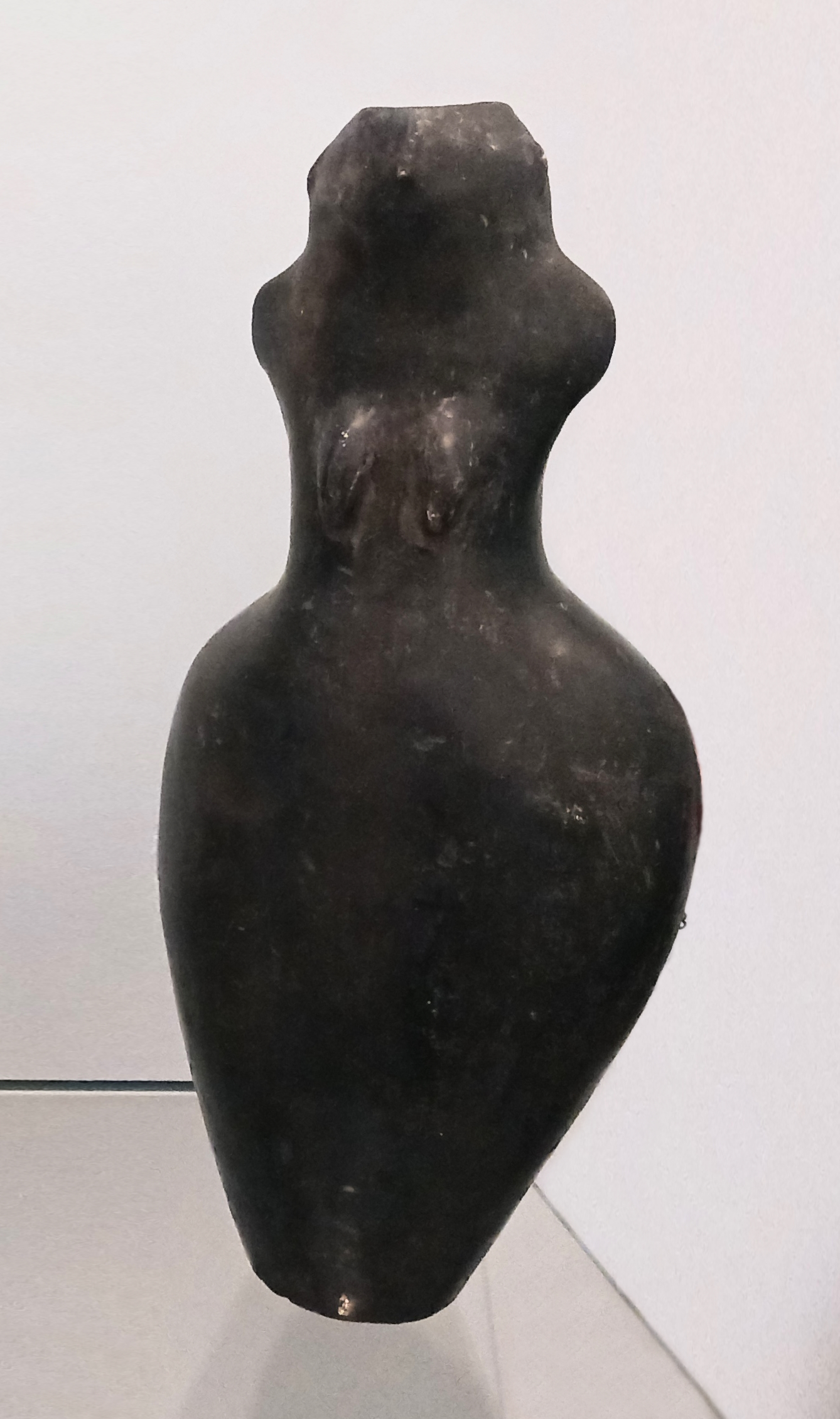
Black polished vessel in the form of a female figure. Grave B102, Abadiya. Naqada IIA (3650-3550 BCE). Ashmolean Museum.

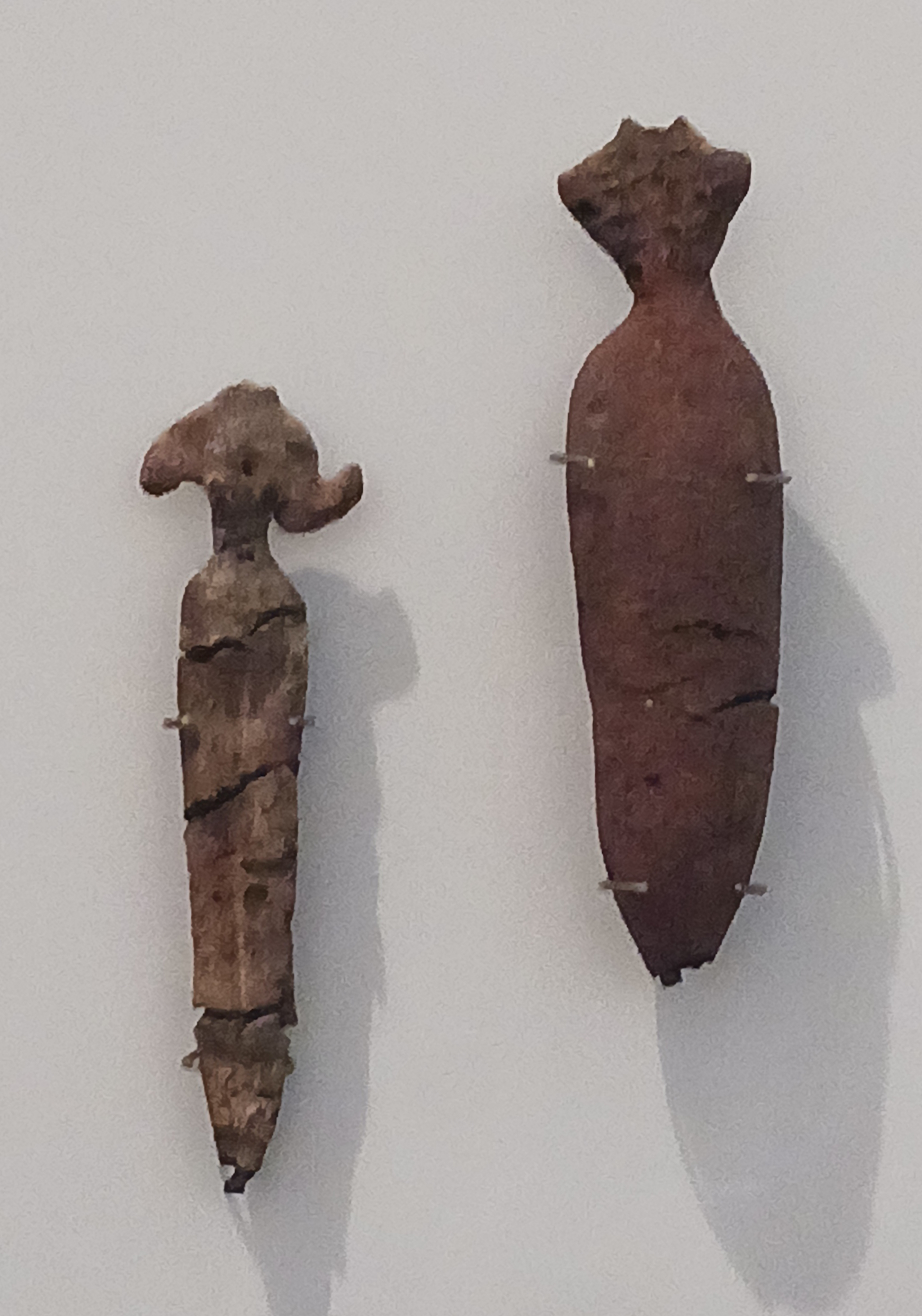
Clay female figurines, Grave B101, Abadiya. Naqada IIA. Ashmolean Museum.

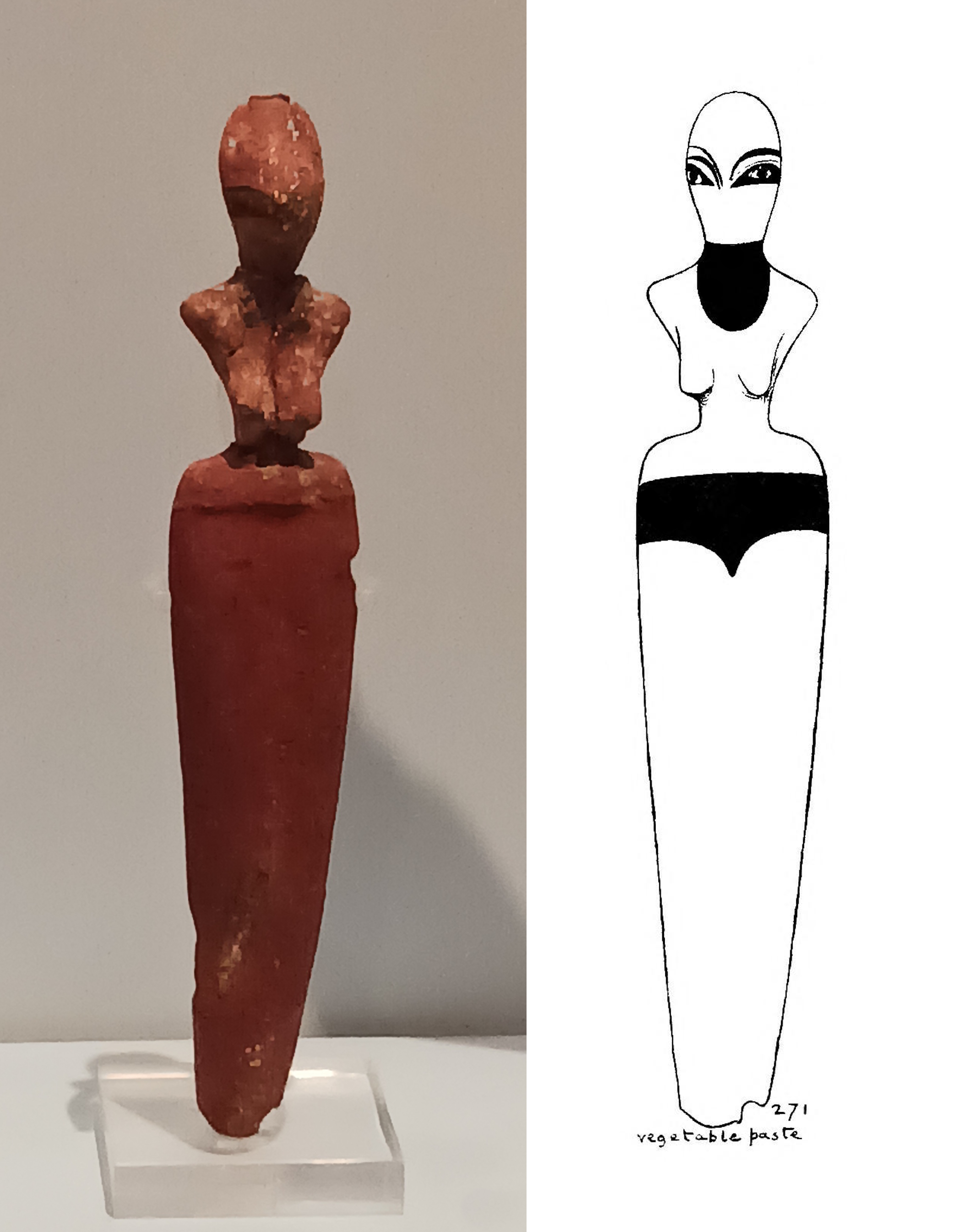
Female figurine, Tomb 271. Naqada IIB. Ashmolean Museum

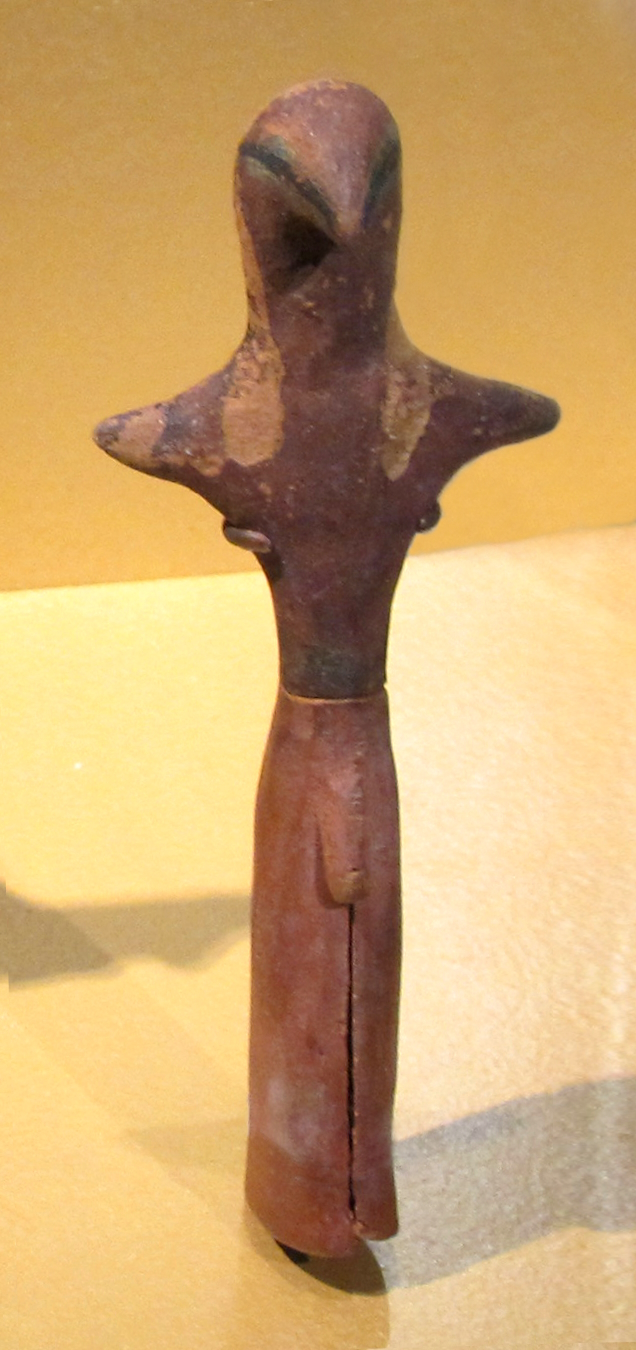
Bird-like male figurine with penis sheath.

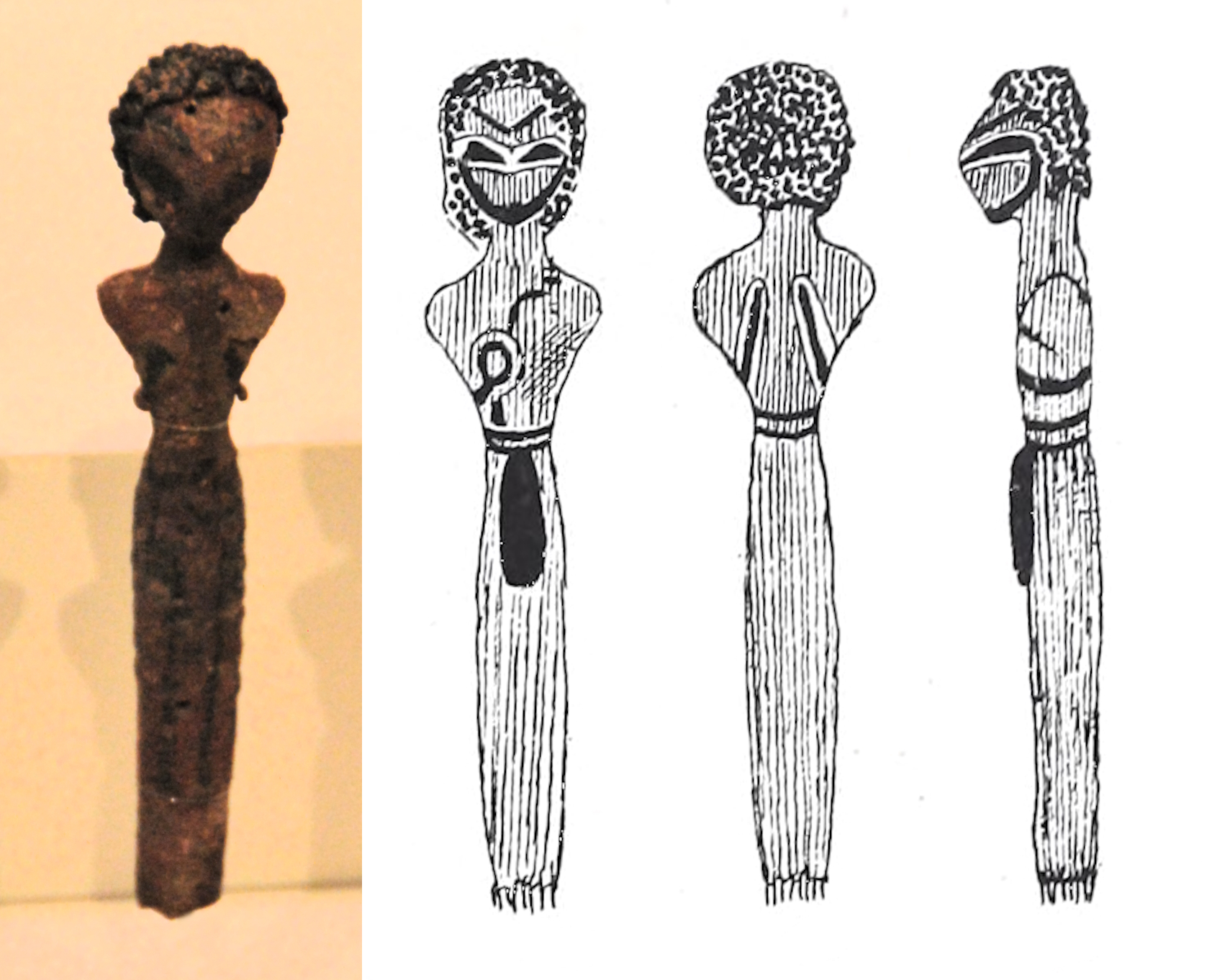
Male statuette with curly hair and penile sheath, Tomb a94, El-Amrah. Dated SD41 (Naqada IIB).

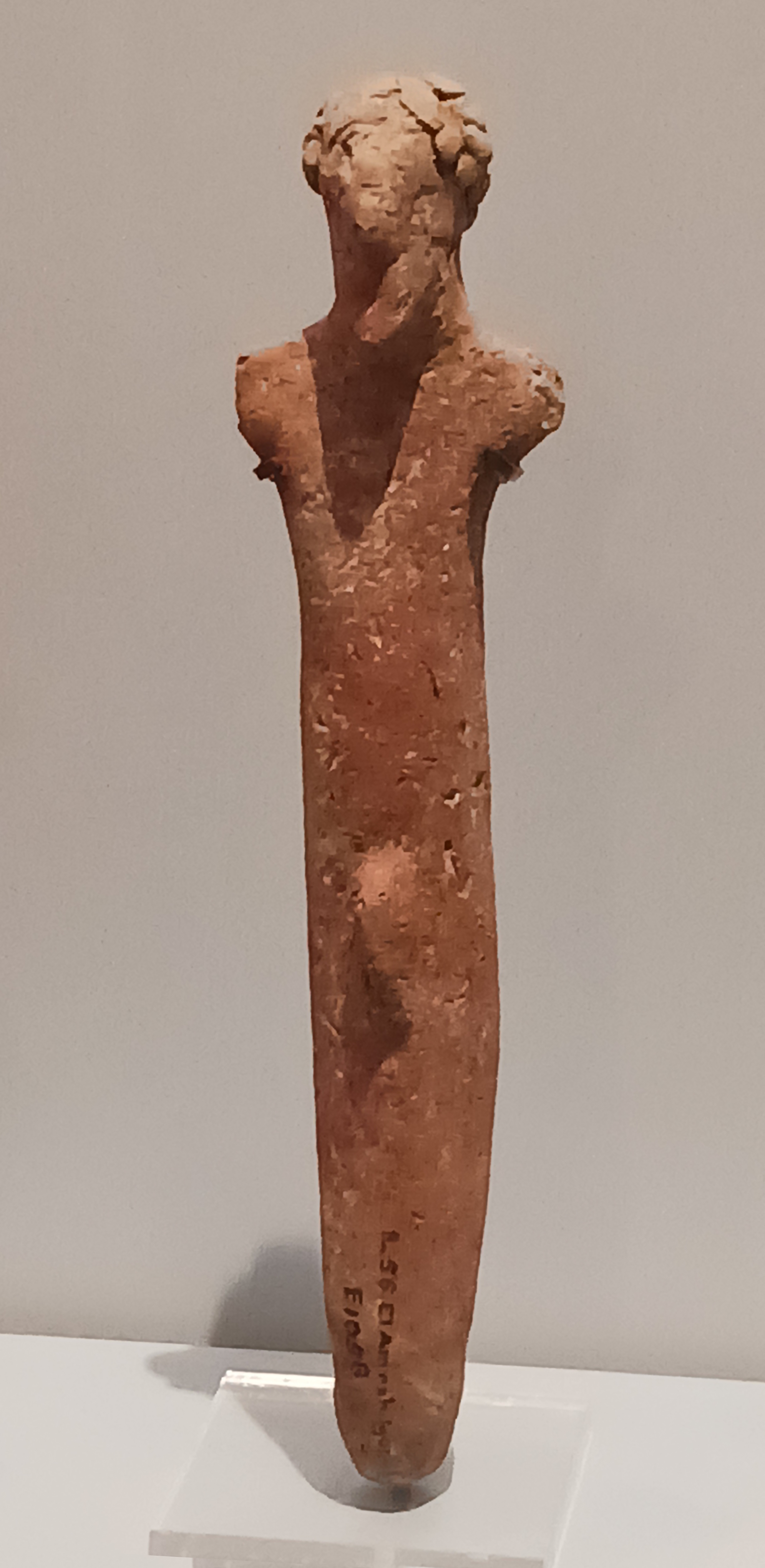
Male figurine with short hair and penile sheath. El-Amra, grave a56, SD46 (early Naqada IIC). Ashmolean Museum.

=== Animal figures ===
Cosmetic palettes are archaeological artifacts, originally used in predynastic Egypt to grind and apply ingredients for facial or body cosmetics. The decorative palettes of the late 4th millennium BCE appear to have lost this function and became commemorative, ornamental, and possibly ceremonial. They were made almost exclusively out of siltstone with a few exceptions. The siltstone originated from quarries in the Wadi Hammamat. Many of the palettes were found at Hierakonpolis, a centre of power in pre-dynastic Upper Egypt. After the unification of the country, the palettes ceased to be included in tomb assemblages.

During the Naqada IIA and IIB periods, fish-shaped palettes appear while rhomboidal palettes tend to disappear, compared to the previous Naqada I period.

Many simple animal ivory tags appears in Naqada IIA graves, together with anthropomorphic ivory tags showing bearded individuals, with only a few specimens in Naqada IIB. There is a clear contemporaneity between these objects.

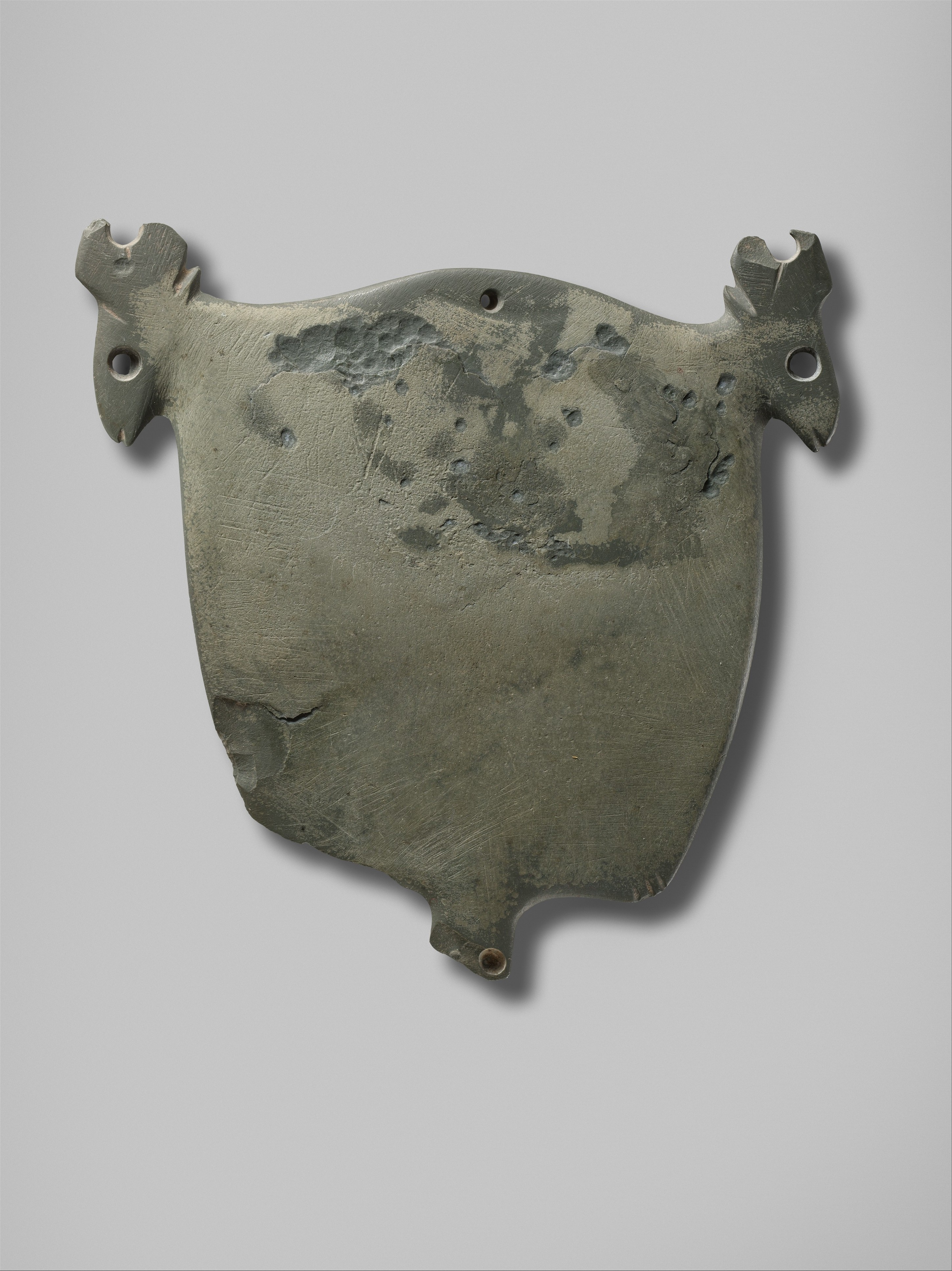
Palette with antelope heads and a turtle, 3650-3500 BC, Naqada II

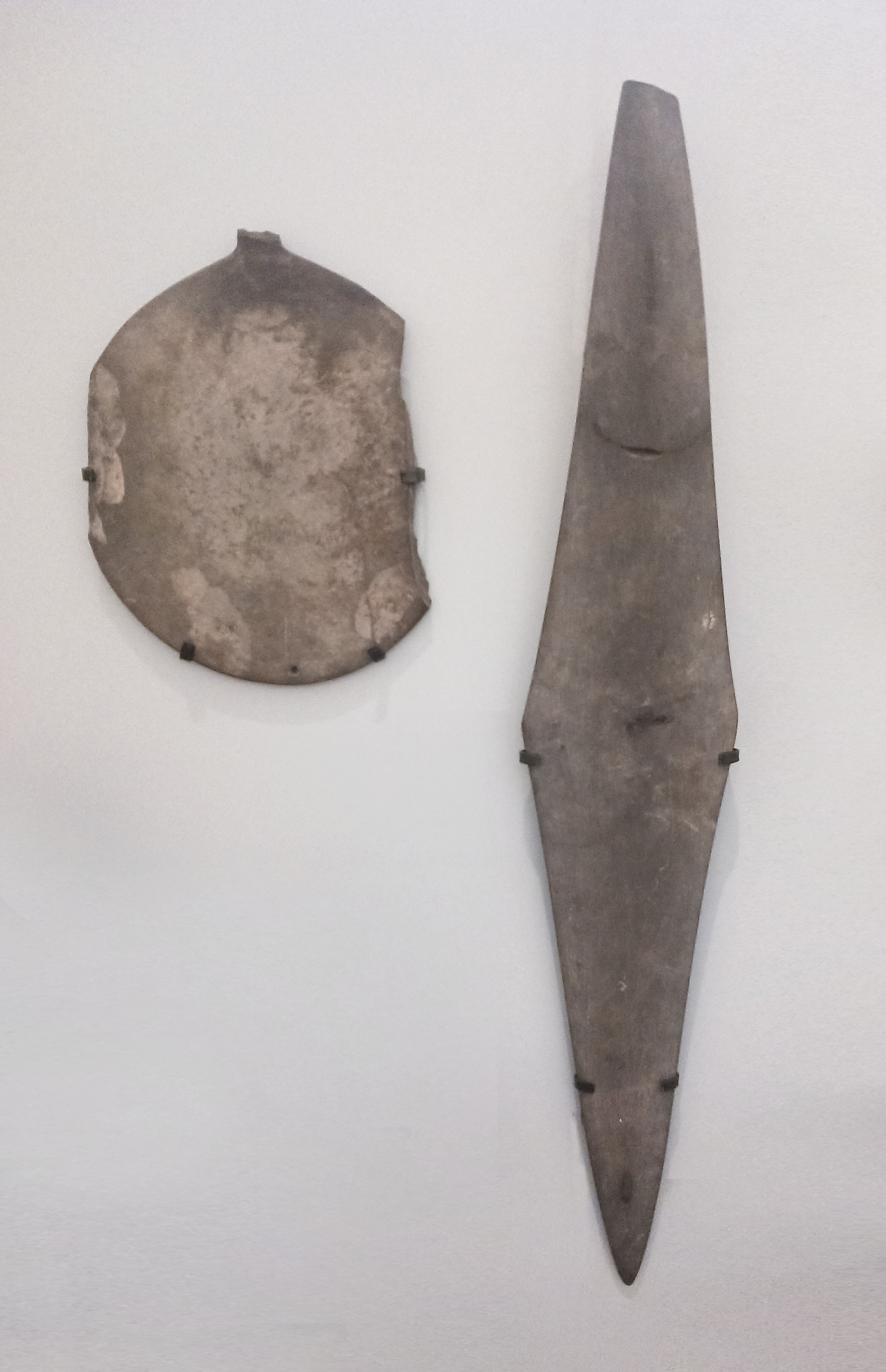
Siltstone palette in the shape of a turtle, and rhombus-shaped schist palette. Abadiya Grave B102. Naqada IIA. Ashmolean Museum

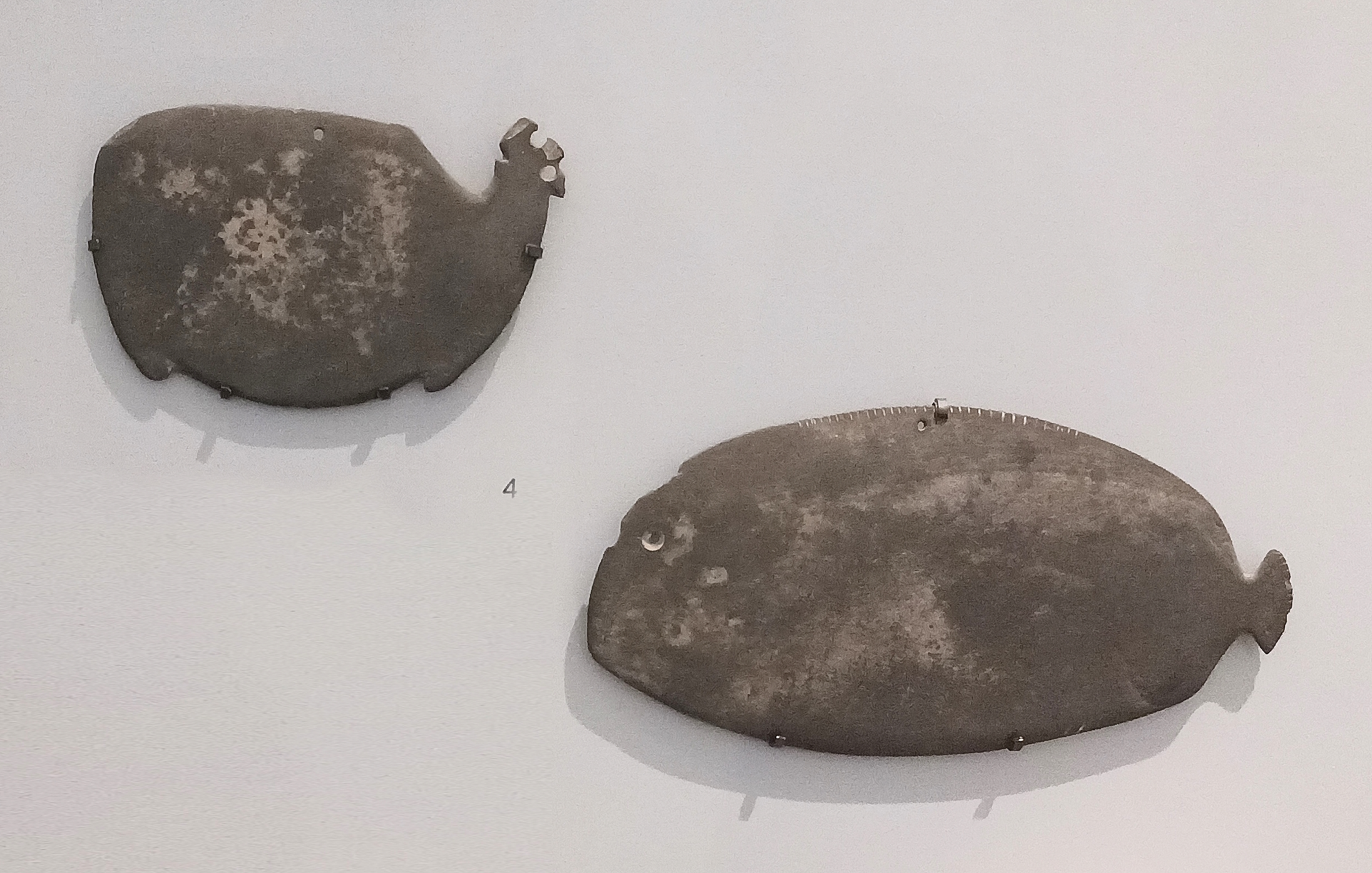
Simple animal-shaped cosmetic palettes. Tomb T4, Naqada, dated Naqada IIB

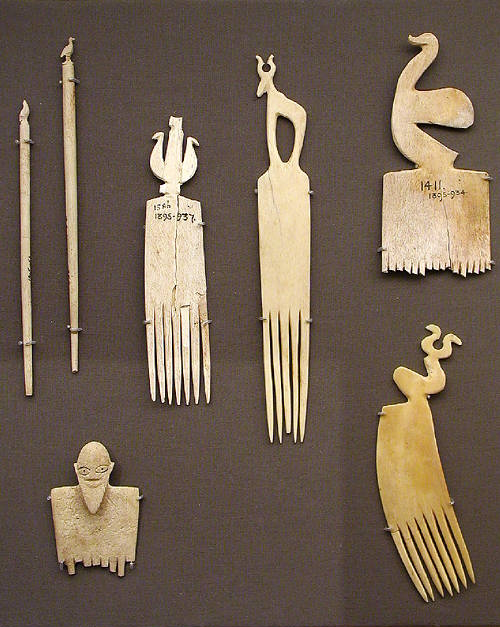
Naqada IIA ivory objects

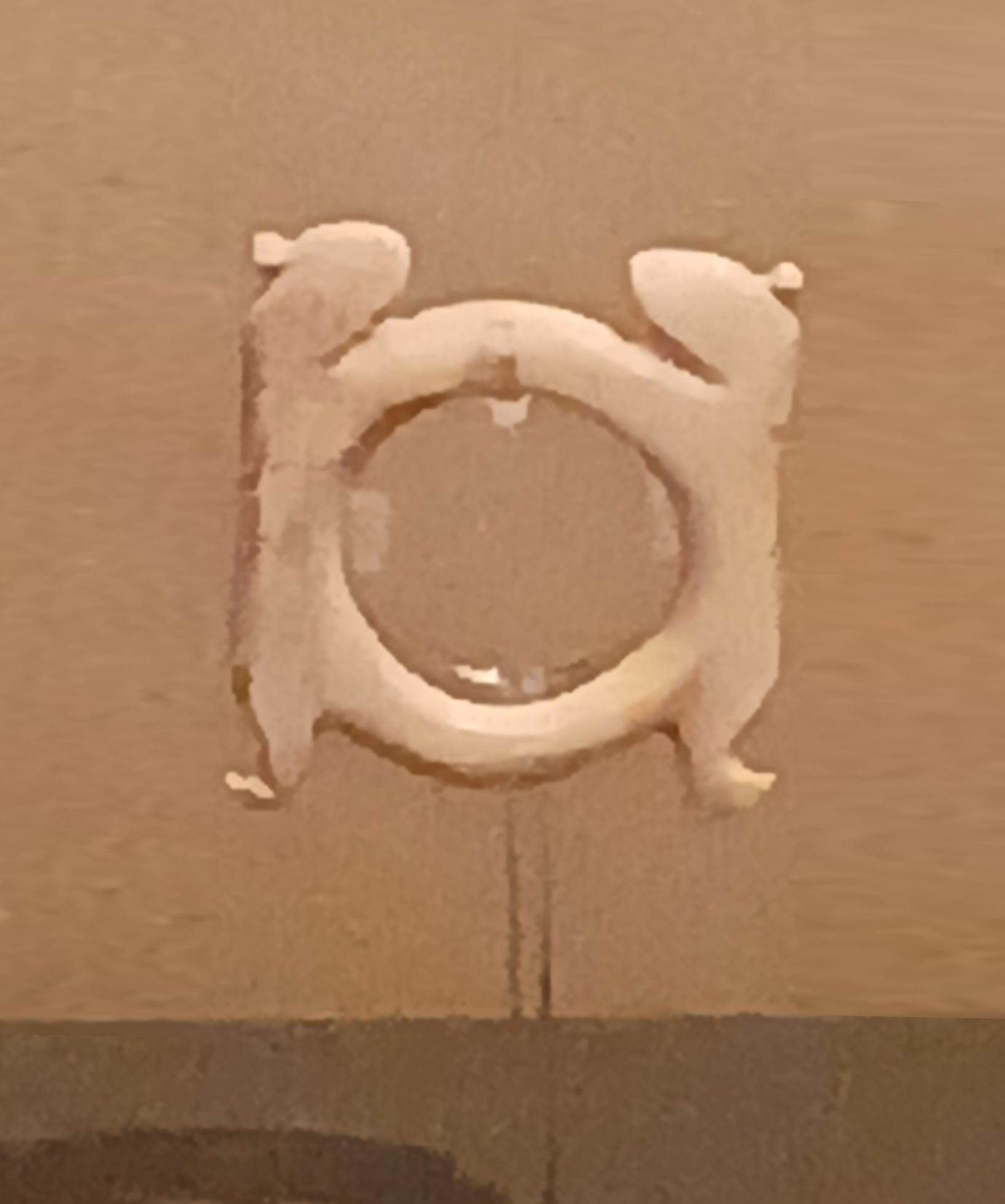
Bone finger ring with two opposite rampant lions (Naqada grave 1480, Naqada IIA).

== Naqada IIC (c.3400 BC) ==
=== Territorial expansion ===
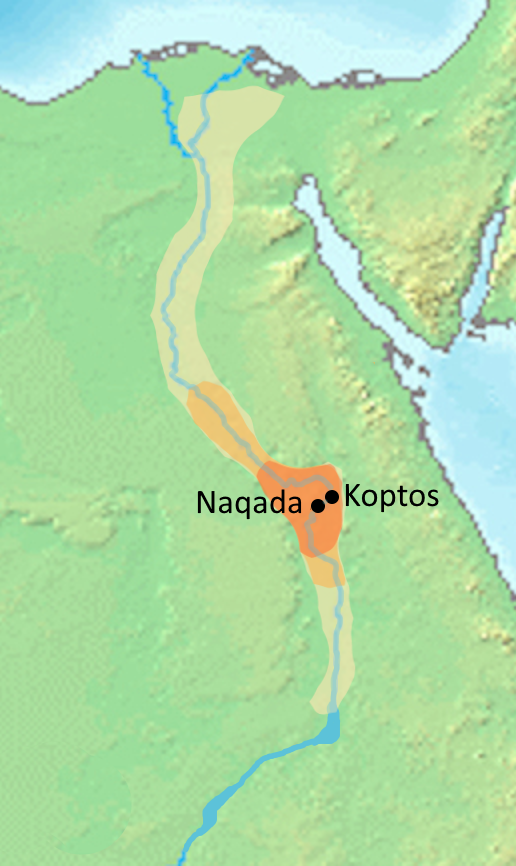
Concentration of Naqada Decorated ware ("D-ware") and distribution: Low: ● Medium: ● High: ●.

Naqada IIC is marked by a significant geographical expansion from the core area around Naqada. Naqada IIC cemeteries are known from the central areas of Naqada IIA and IIB (Matmar, Salmany, Naqada and Armant), but also from Badari, Hammamiya, Naqa ed-Deir and the Hierakonpolis Fort Cemetery, and north into the Fayum (Gerza, Haraga, and Abusir el-Meleq, all traditional areas of the Maadi-Buto culture), and possibly as far as the large cemetery at Minshat Abu Omar in the eastern Nile delta, fully occupied in Naqada IID. In Nubia, A-Group cemeteries were also strongly influence by Egyptian style.

Contacts with the Near East were at their most significant during the Naqada II (ca. 3600–3350 BCE) and III (ca. 3350–2950 BCE) periods, corresponding to the Late Uruk (ca. 3500–3100 BCE) and Jemdet Nasr (ca. 3100–2900 BCE) periods in Mesopotamia, and to the Susa I-Susa II and Proto-Elamite (ca. 3100–2700 BCE) periods in Elam. Trade between Egypt and the Levant took place during the late Predynastic (ca. 3500–2950 BCE) and Early Dynastic (ca. 2950–2593 BCE) periods, as vessels with content were exchanged in both directions, and Egypt imported lapis lazuli from Central Asia and spouted jug designs and actual cylinder seals from Mesopotamia and Elam as early as Naqada II. Intense contacts then essentially vanished and would only resume much later during the Egyptian New Kingdom (ca. 1570–1069 BCE), during the international upheaval of the Late Bronze Age.

=== Artistic rupture ===
Artistic styles and techniques became radically different from Naqada IIC, representing an "iconographic rupture" with previous systems. The eclecticism of the previous periods, with artefacts such as tusks, tags, or zoomorphic models disappeared, as well as some styles such as C-ware. Regional particularisms vanished in favor of standardized artistic traditions across Egypt. New technologies were adopted, such as the introduction of marl clay for pottery, which used desert deposits rather than Nile alluvial sources. New and original iconographies were introduced, as seen in D-ware. Compared to the very restricted domain of Naqada I-IIB assemblages, these new productions also had a much wider geographical scope, from the second cataract of the Nile in the south northwards to the Nile Delta and even the Chalcolithic Levant. Foreign features were adopted from the Levant (such as wavy ledge handles) and possibly from Mesopotamia following the Uruk expansion (such as lapis lazuli and cylinder seals). Ritual and social practices also changed, with for example statuettes essentially disappearing from the archaeological record for Naqada IIC and IID, being replaced by other forms of artistic expression.

=== Pottery ===
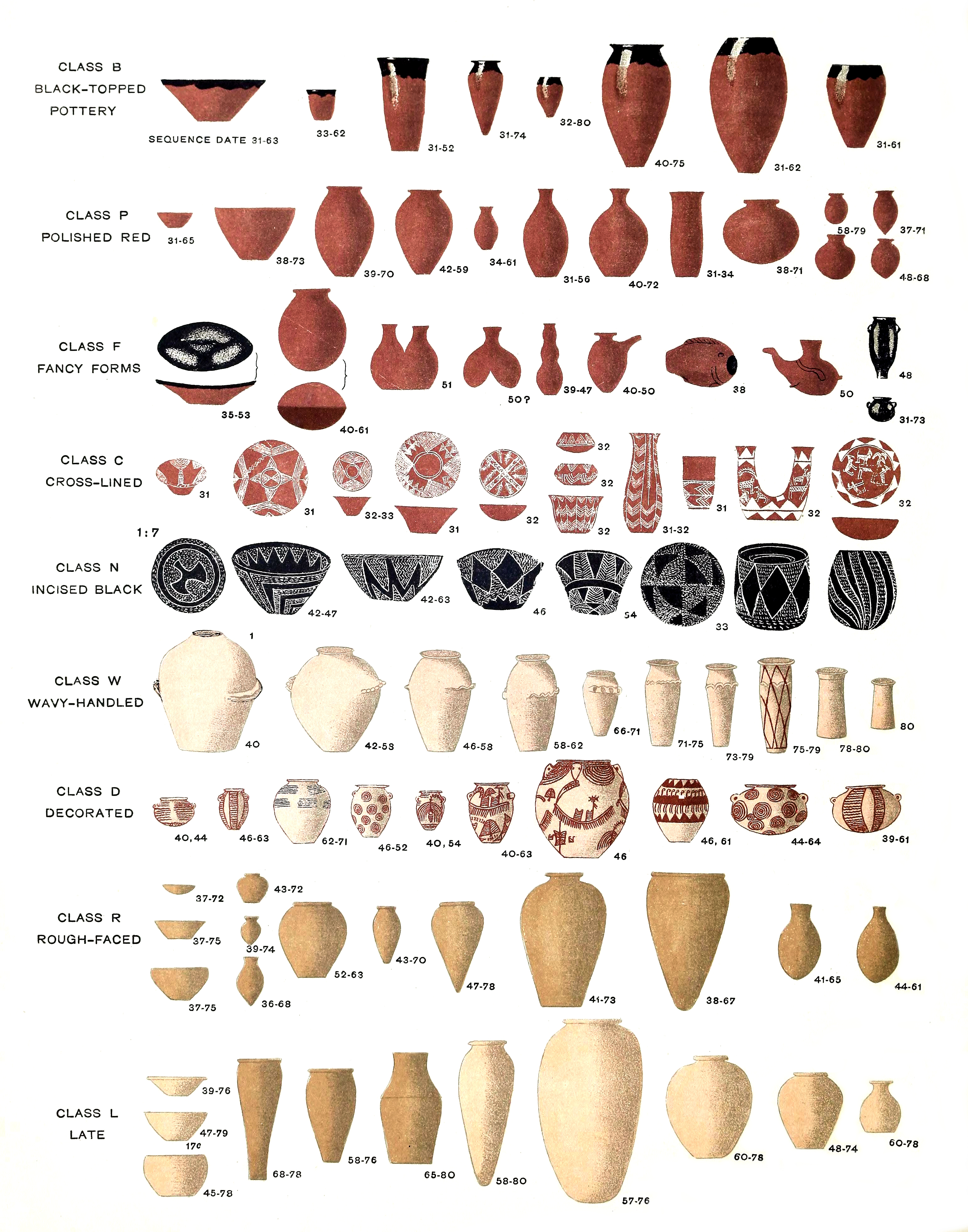
Naqada pottery types, as developed by Flinders Petrie

Naqada II pottery mainly uses two types of clay. First, a grey clay from the alluvium of the Nile, which is rich in ferrous oxide and becomes red to brown upon firing in an oxidizing environment. Second, a clay of limestone origin or marly (a mix limestone and clay), obtained from regular rivers and wadis, which is yellowish to white due to its high content in calcium, and becomes creamy upon firing.

Naqada II practiced to various extents all the types of pottery known from the Naqada period, but in addition was characterized by the development of new pottery types with wavy handles, coarse utilitarian wares, and decorated vessels (called "D-type" for "decorated") consisting in brown paint over a cream surface. Naqada II had many types of potteries, which were categorized chronologically by Petrie from SD ("Sequence Date") 38 to 62 (SD 38-45 covers Naqada IIA and IIB, and SD 45-62 covers Naqada IIC-IID):

- Rough ware (type "R", all Naqada II): a new type of pottery with vegetal particles which burn upon firing and create an uneven surface.
- Black Top ware (type "B", all Naqada II): Polished red body with black top
- White Cross-Lined ware (type "C", Naqada IIA, IIB): Polished red body with white painting
- Fancy Forms ware (type "F", all Naqada II): Pottery with fancy shapes or animal-shaped
- Decorated ware (type "D", all Naqada II): a new type of pottery with beige to pink surface and ochre to brown paintings
- Black Incised ware (Nubian-style: type "N", Naqada IIA, IIC, IID): a new type of black pottery with incised geometrical white lines
- Polished Red ware (type "P", Naqada IIB, IIC, IID): red polished pottery
- Late ware (type "L", Naqada IIC, IID): a new type of pottery in creamy marly clay
- Wavy-handled ware (type "W", Naqada IIC, IID): new type of vessels with wavy handles

During Naqada IIC and IID Rough ware ("R-ware") dominates, while "D-ware" and "W-ware" appear and Black Top ware ("B-ware") almost disappears.

=== High-level Tomb T5, Naqada ===
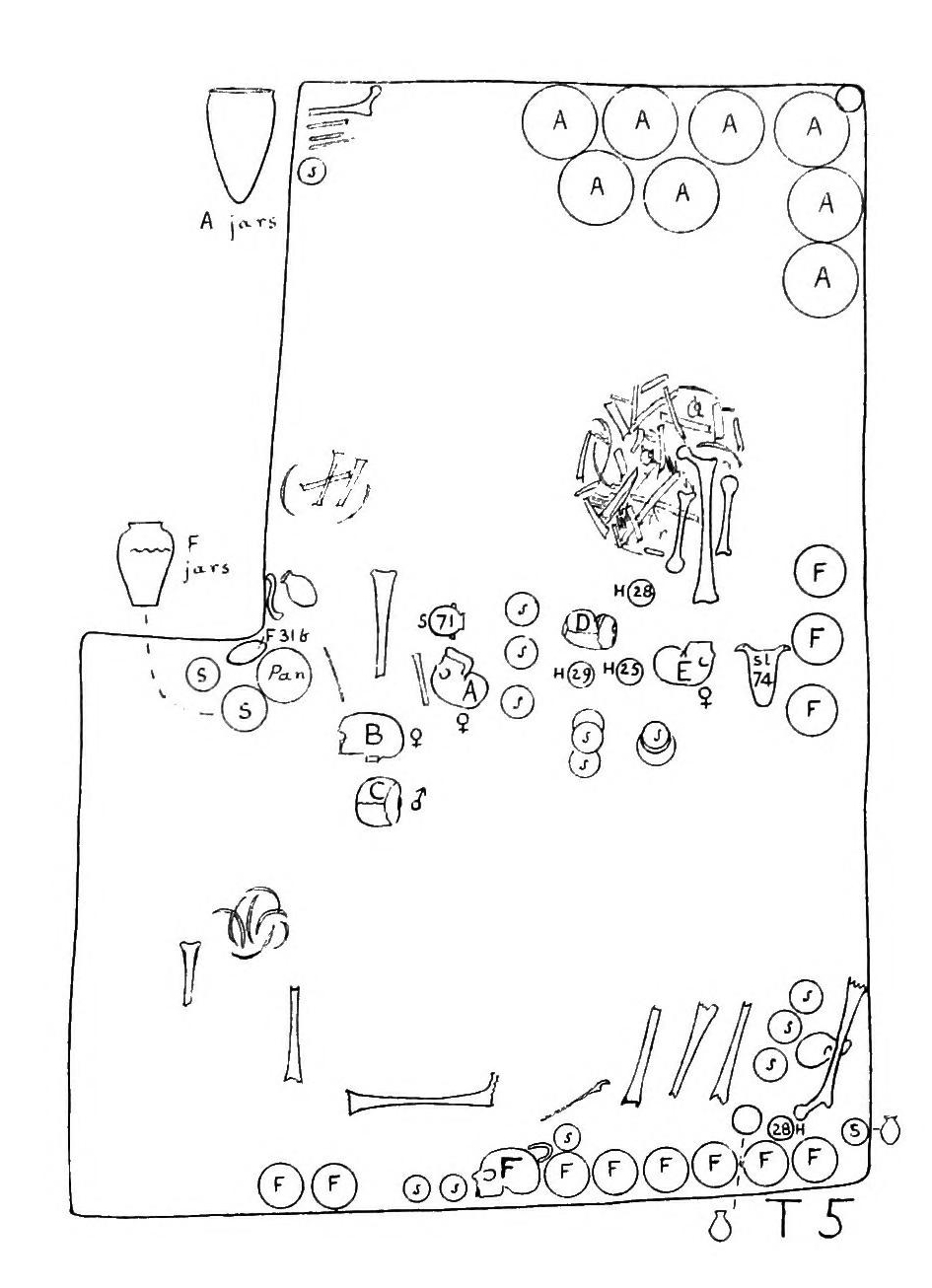
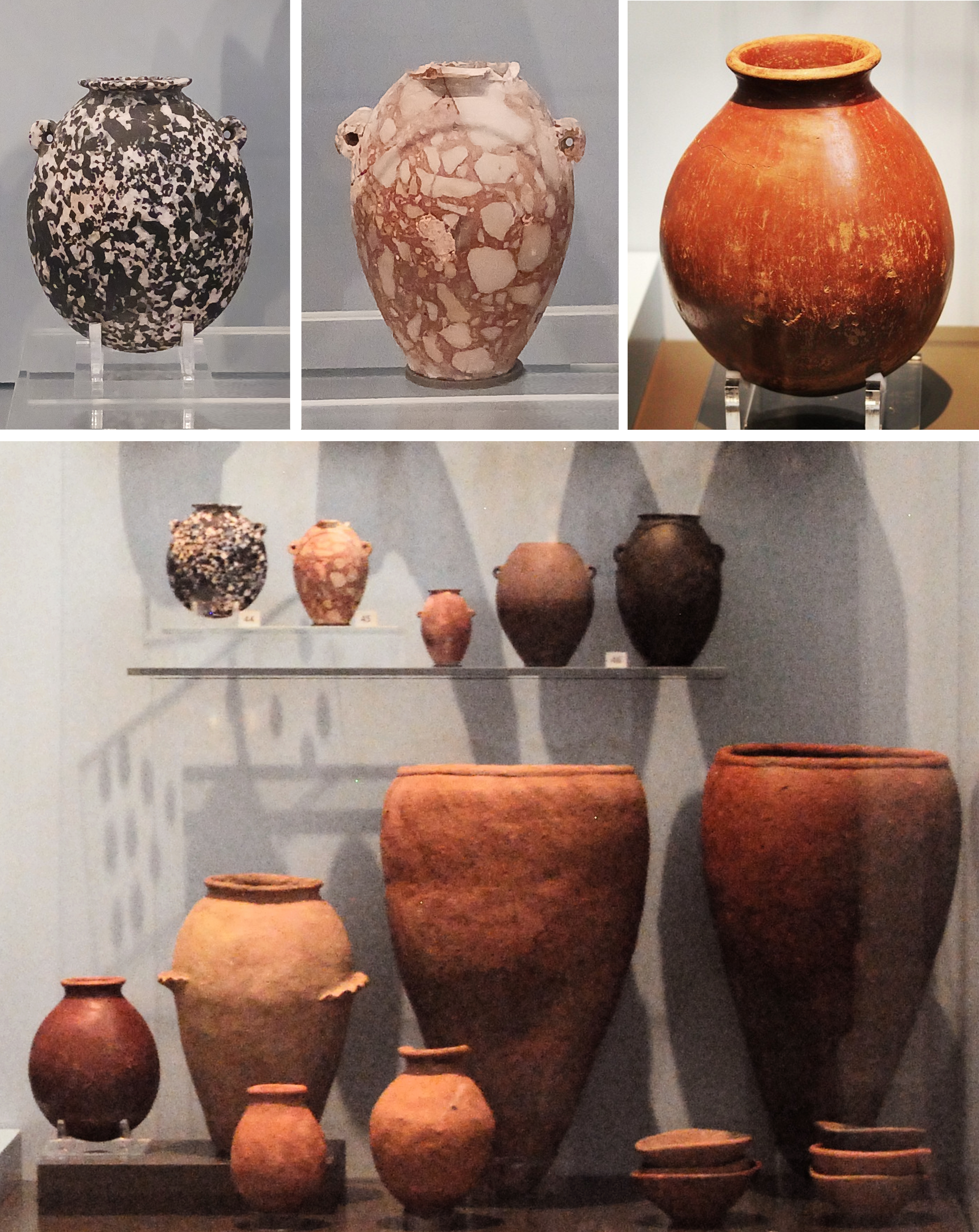
Tomb T5 assemblage, Naqada elite Cemetery T, Naqada IIC period

One of the most important burials at Naqada was Tomb T5, an undisturbed wealthy grave belonging to the elite Cemetery T at Naqada, dated to Naqada IIC, circa 3400 BC, Sequence Date 50. Contrary to the usual Egyptian graves placed in caves or hollows, this tomb belonged to a different category: large, deep, graves formed from a rectangular vertical pit. Tomb T4 in Naqada is another such grave. As in all wealthy graves, it was roofed over with beams and brushwood, a system not seen in standard Egyptian tombs.

The tomb contained six detached skulls, with a heap of bones in middle and bones along the sides. There were one man and a least four females, suggesting a sacrifice of concubines or servants attending the deceased. Such practice is characteristic of later royal burials at Abydos.

The tomb was also furnished with large jars, some of them filled with organic materials, including possibly beer and scented fats, probably offerings. Finely-polished stone vases, made of diorite and breccia, were positioned among the skulls. The pottery of this high-level tomb consisted exclusively of Fancy-form (F-ware), Wavy-handled (W-ware) and multiple Rough-ware vessels.

=== Stone vessels ===
Luxurious stone vessels, hollowed out and shaped from blocks of semi-precious stones, were also crafted, and were often models for pottery types. The technique was probably known from the time of the Badarian culture and northern Egypt seems to have played an important role in their production. Stone allowed for more precision than pottery, and was the material of choice to obtain the most beautiful and the finest results. Stone vessels started to evolve towards shapes inspired by the shapes of Decorated wares. Excellent stonework, with a remarkable ability to handle colors and textures, would become one of the principal characteristics of Classical Egyptian culture, and was probably developed over centuries of excellence and specialization.

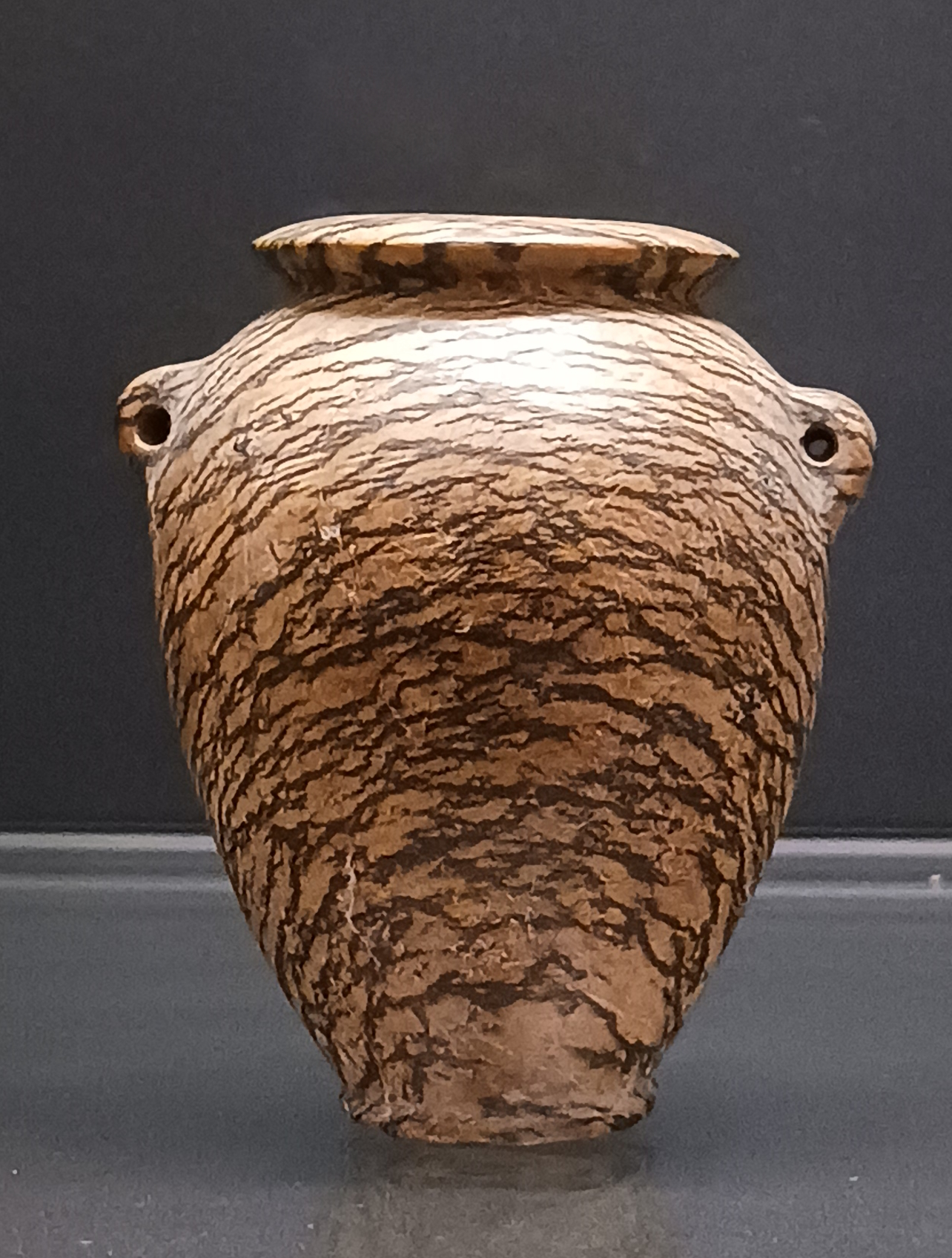
Serpentinite vessel, Naqada II, 3500–3100 BCE. Louvre Museum, E 10887 (F)

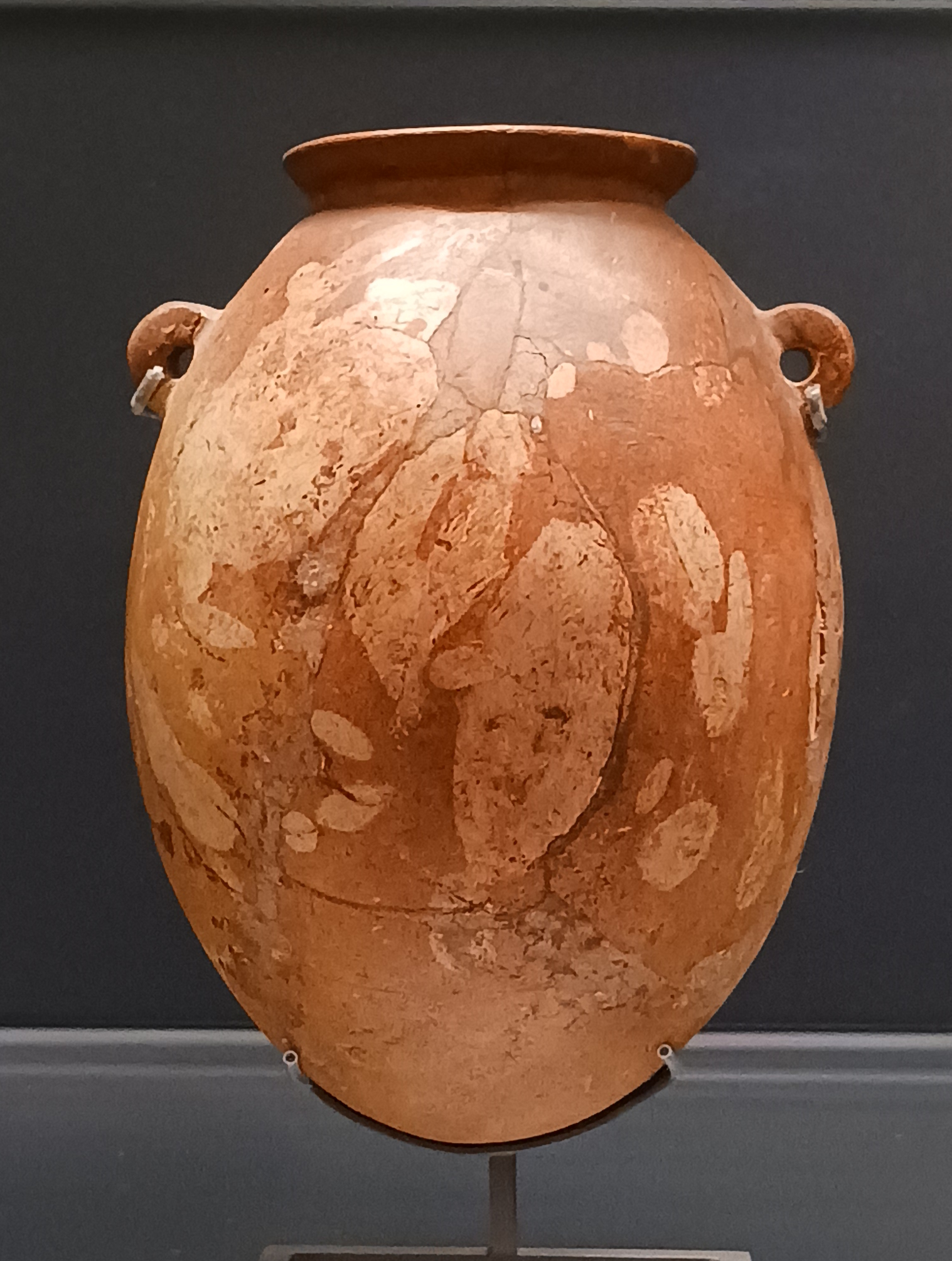
Breccia vessel, Naqada II, 3500–3100 BCE, Louvre Museum E 10887 (G)

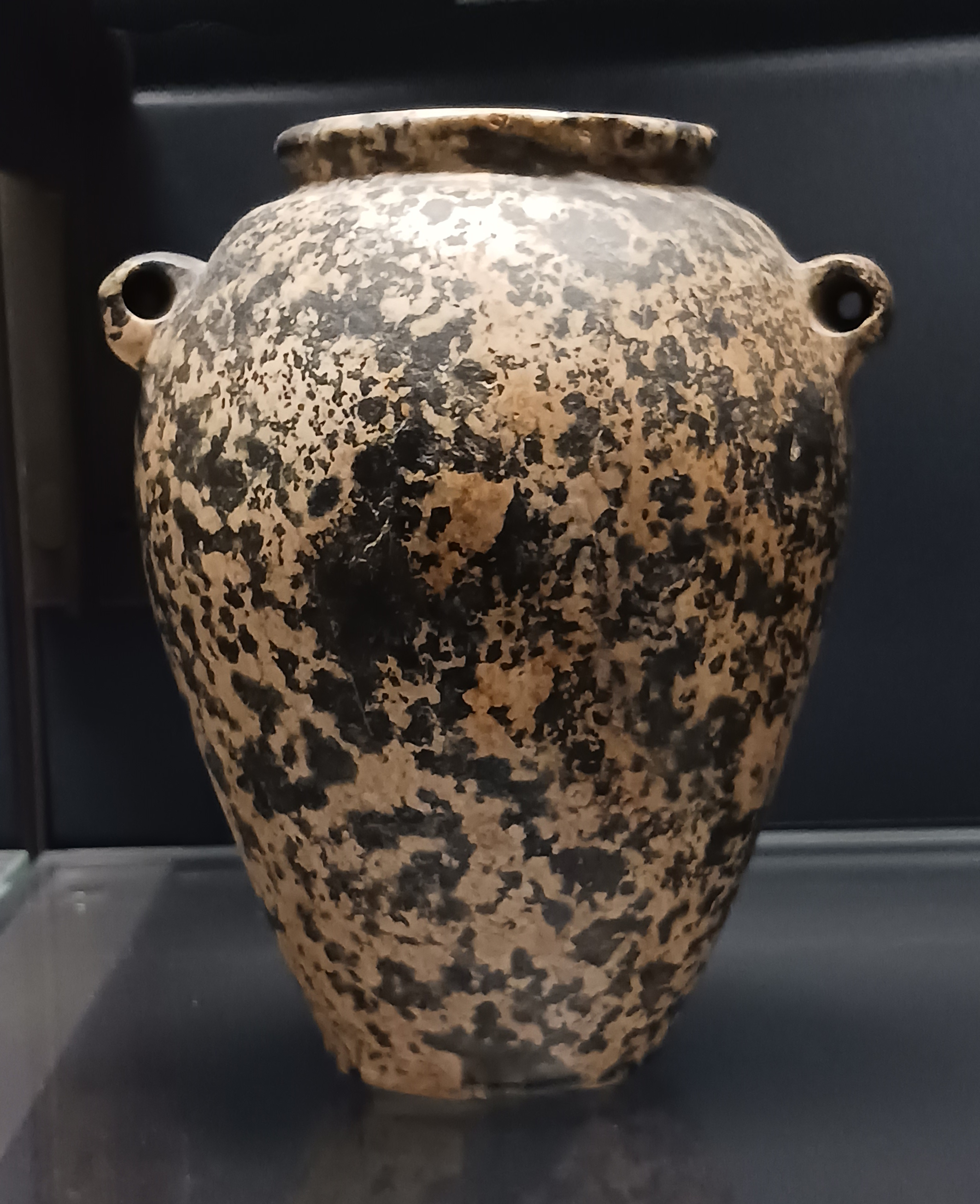
Large vessel in granite, Naqada II, 3500–3100 BCE. Louvre Museum, E 23220

=== Mesopotamian-style pottery ===
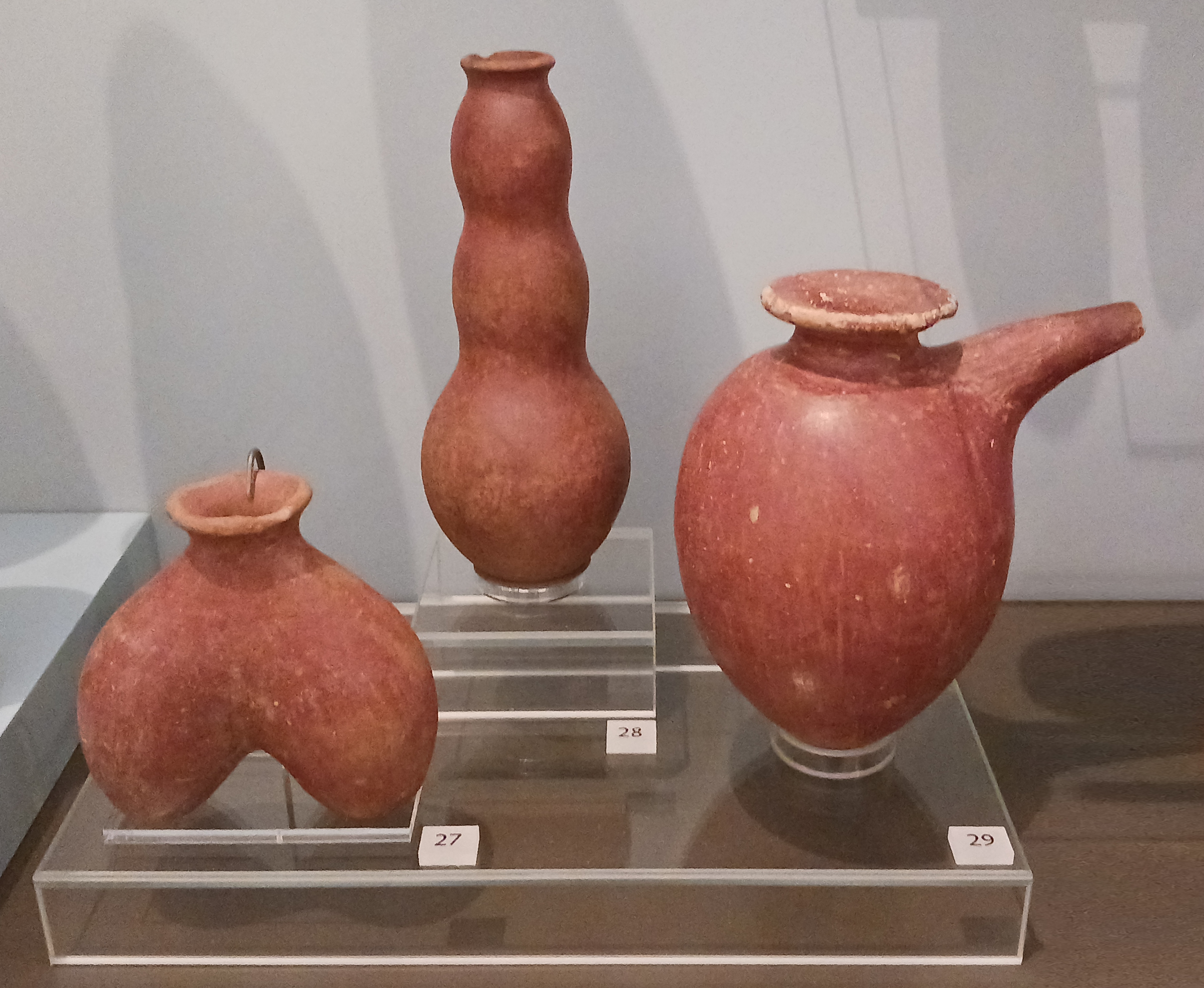
Fancy (type "F") vessels, with Mesopotamian-style straight-spouted jar (Naqada IIC, right) dated c. 3450–3325 BC. Ashmolean Museum

Red-slipped spouted pottery items dating to around 3500 BCE and after (Naqada II C/D), which were probably used for pouring water, beer or wine, suggest that Egypt was in contact with and being influenced by Mesopotamia around that time. This type of pottery was manufactured in Egypt, with Egyptian clay, but its shape, particularly the spout, is certainly Mesopotamian in origin. Such vessels were new and rare in pre-Dynastic Egypt, but had been commonly manufactured in the Mesopotamian cities of Nippur and Uruk for centuries. This indicated that Egyptians were familiar with Mesopotamian types of pottery. The discovery of these vessels initially encouraged the development of the dynastic race theory, according to which Mesopotamians would have established the first Pharaonic line, but is now considered by many scholars to be simply indicative of cultural influence and borrowings circa 3500 BCE, although there is an established gene flow from Mesopotamia and West Asia into Egypt .

Spouted jars of Mesopotamian design start to appear in Egypt in the Naqada II period. Various Uruk pottery vases and containers have been found in Egypt in Naqada contexts, confirming that Mesopotamian finished goods were imported into Egypt, although the past contents of the jars have not been determined yet. Scientific analysis of ancient wine jars in Abydos has shown there was some high-volume wine trade with the Levant and Mesopotamia during this period.

=== Decorated pottery ("D-Ware") ===
Decorated "D" ware was essentially produced between 3,650 and 3,400 BC, during the Naqada IIC and IID periods. It succeeded White cross-lined pottery ("C-ware"), which was current from 3,900 to 3,650 BC, from Naqada IA to Naqada IIA and Naqada IIB, before vanishing. This pottery used a different type of clay, not brownish Nilothic clay, but a white clay of limestone origin or marly (a mix limestone and clay), obtained from regular rivers and wadis or desert sources, which is yellowish to white due to its high content in calcium, and becomes creamy upon firing. The new painting technique was different, since D-ware used brown painting over cream-bodied pottery, while the older C-ware used white or cream white painting over a red background. In addition to the different types of ceramic base and the different colors used for painting, the types of drawings and well as their style also differ widely between C-ware and D-ware. Overall, the layout of drawings of the Naqada II D-ware was much more regular and constrained than that of C-ware, a possible consequence of increased hierarchy and control in society during the Naqada II period. These vessels were found in graves, but were also used in daily life.

Pictures of ceremonial reed boats appear on some of these vessels, showing male and female figures standing aboard, the boat being equipped with oars and two cabins. The regular presence of ships in these paintings suggests intense activity along the Nile river. Some masculine figures also wear a tall feathered or foliage headdress. Timber was necessarily for the construction of large boats capable of trading along the Nile, and such timber could only be found in the Levant, which may have been an added motivation for expansion towards the north.

Although men with beards are ubiquitous in sculptures, they never appear in these paintings.

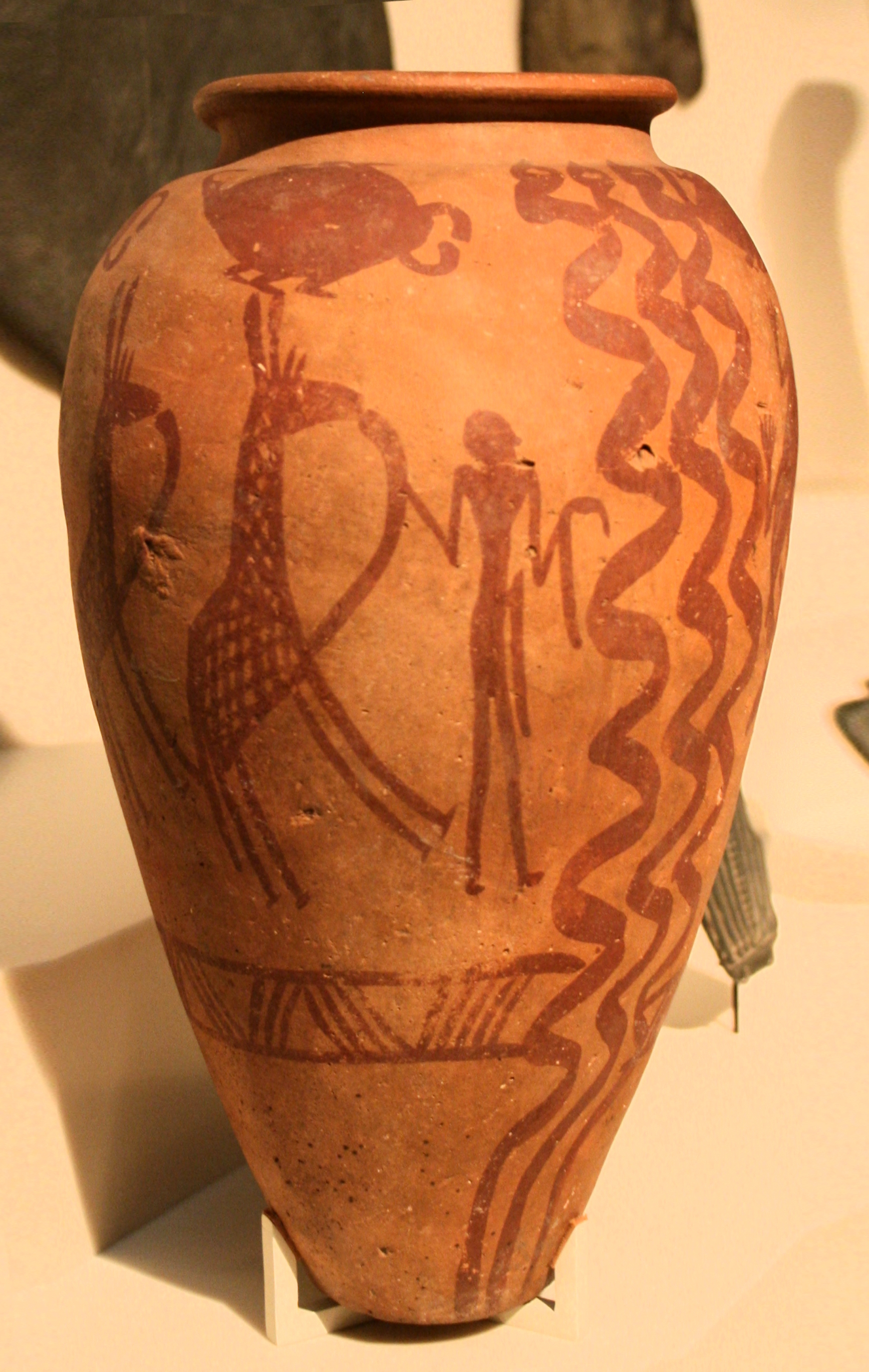
Paintings with symbols on Naqada II pottery. 3500–3200 BC.

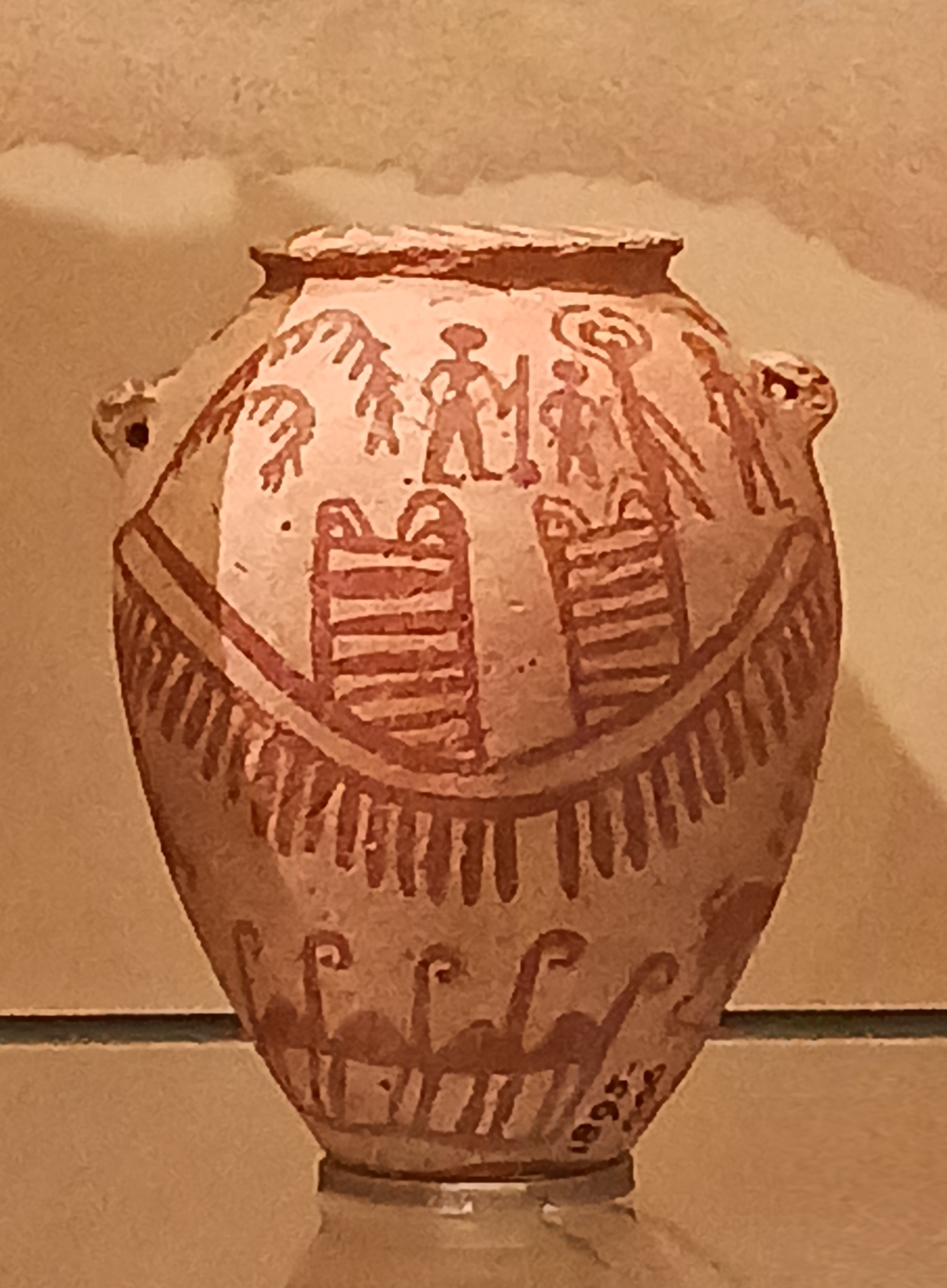
Painted jar, Naqada grave 173. Ashmolean Museum, AN 1895.606.

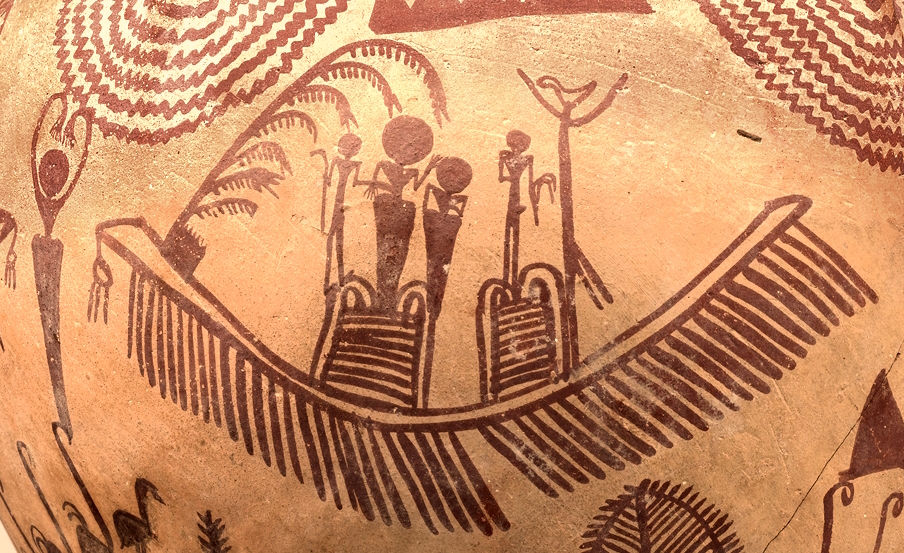
Boat with human figures, Naqada II, 3500–3300 BC, Egypt

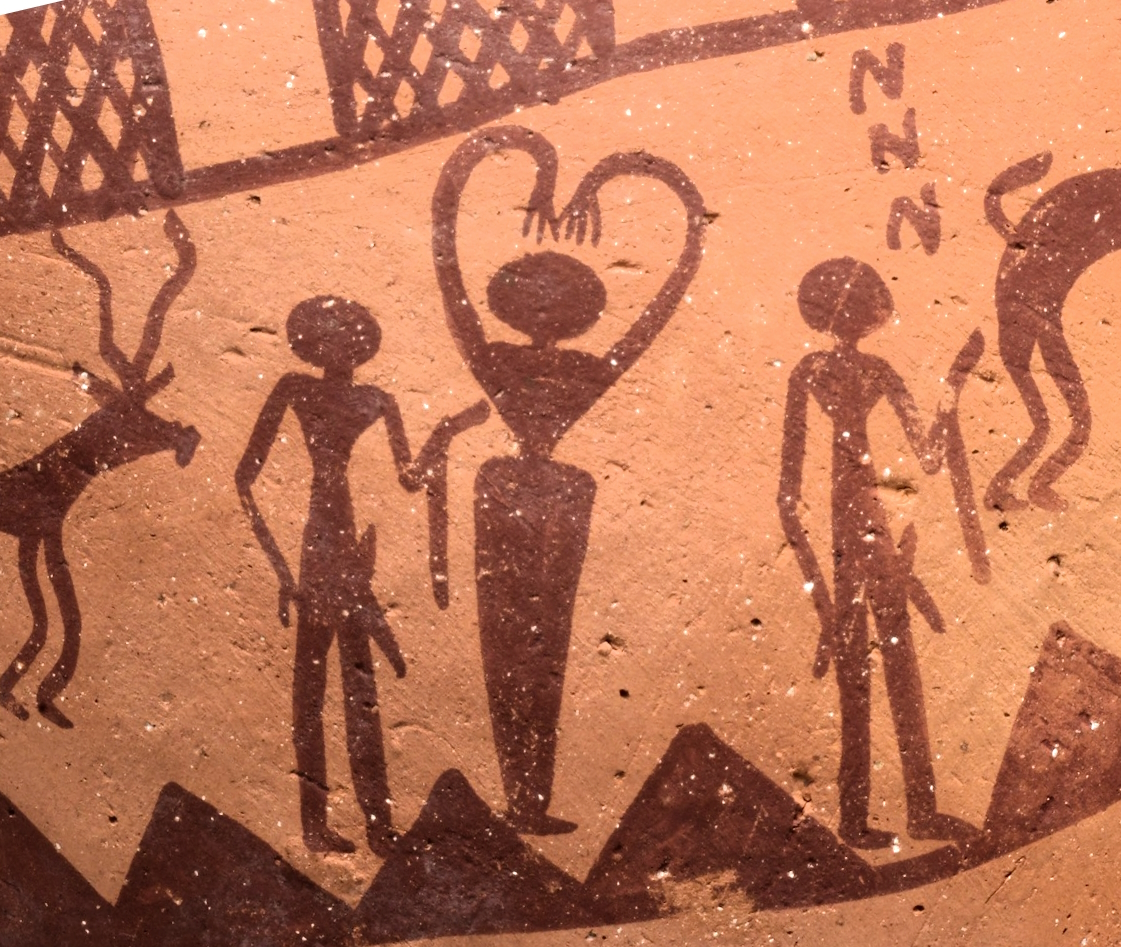
Bowl depicting people, animals, and plants. Naqada IIC-D, ca. 3450–3325 BC.

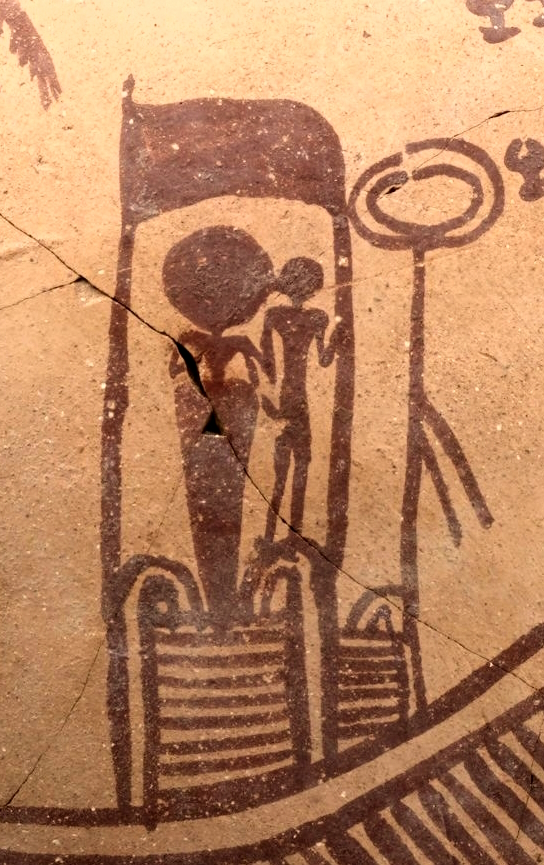
Man and woman on a boat, Naqada II

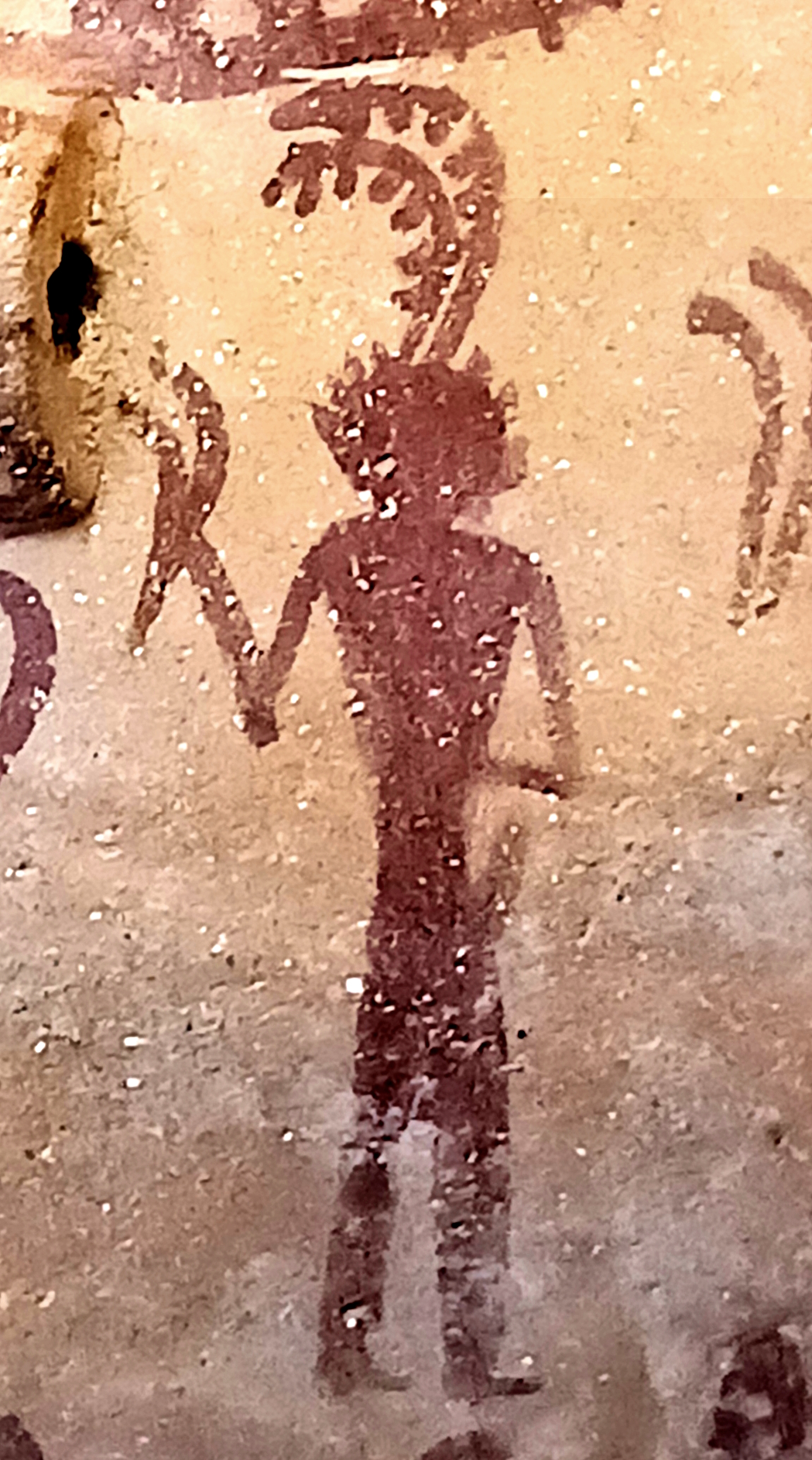
Male feathered figure. Jar Naqada IIC, El-Amra b225. British Museum, EA35502

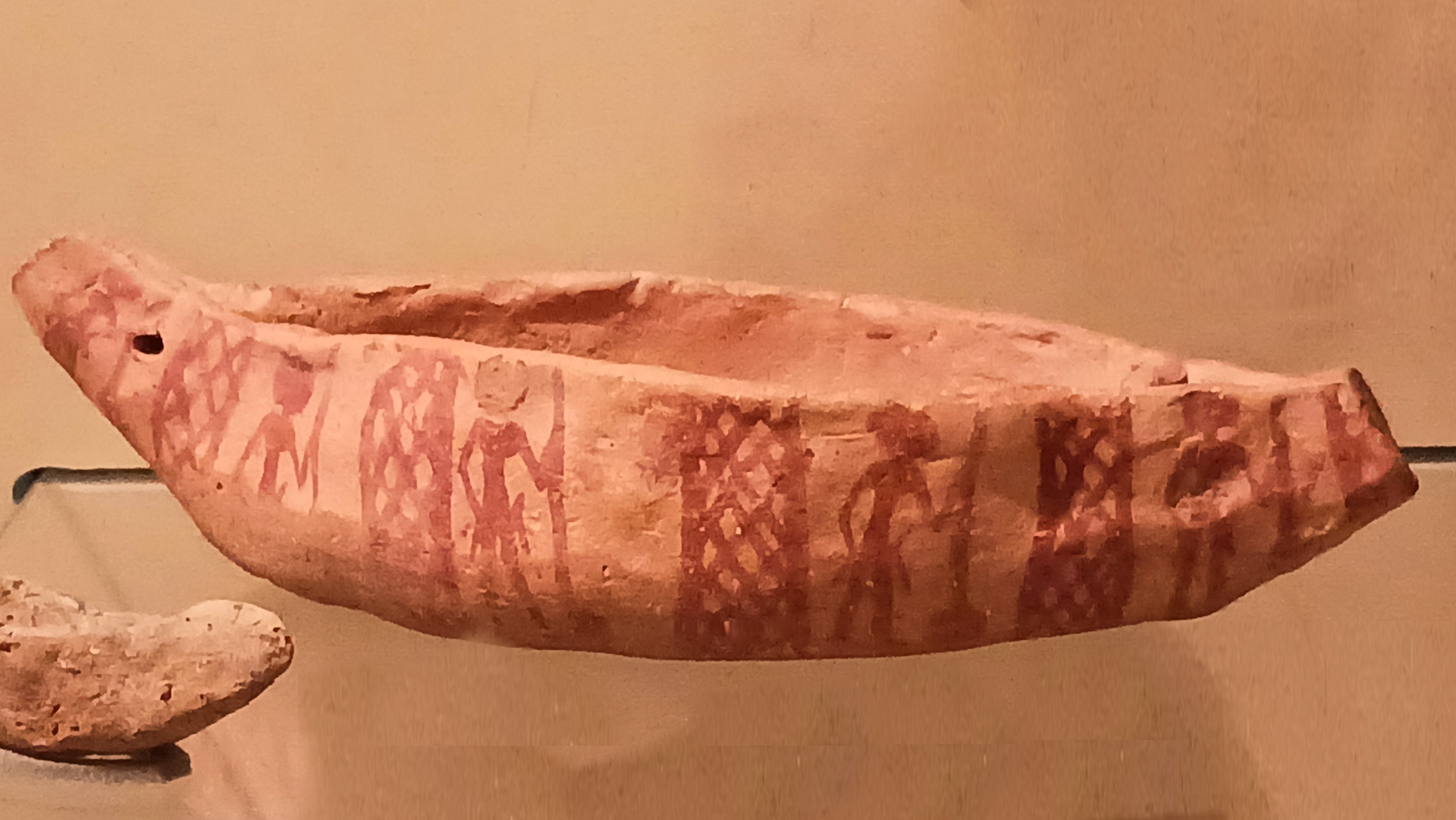
Clay model boat with depictions of oarsmen. Naqada grave 566. Naqada Naqada IId1 (ca. 3400 BC). Ashmolean Museum, AN 1895.609.

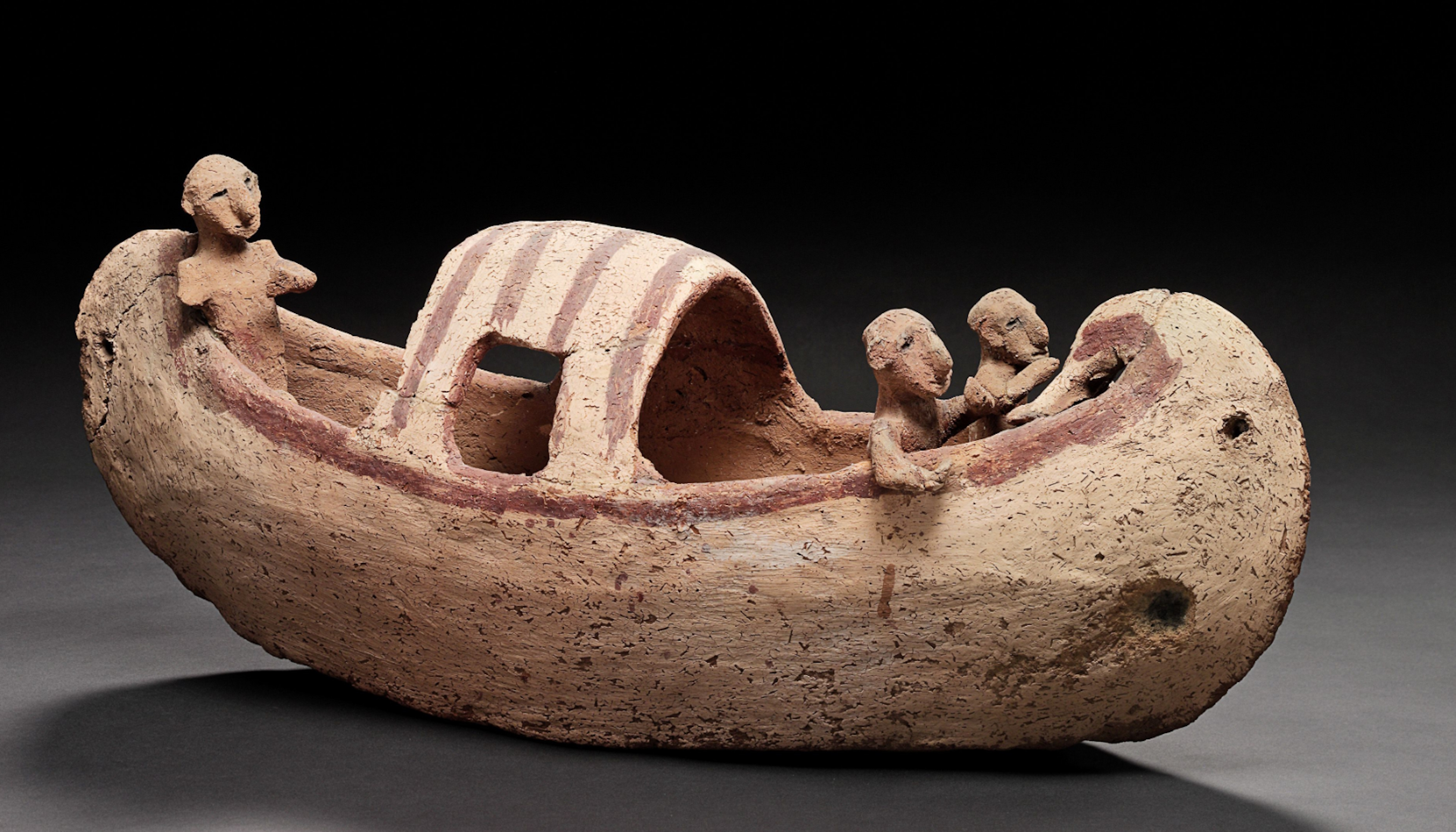
Boat and crew, Naqada II.

=== Gold objects ===
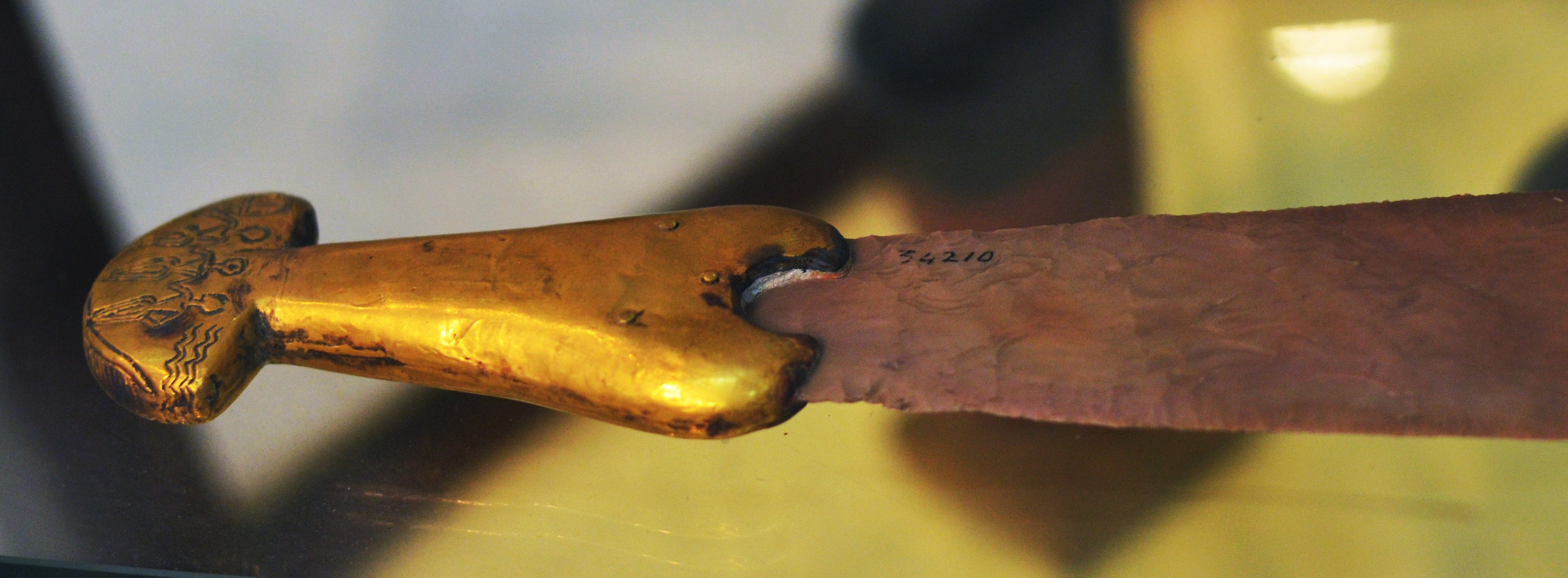
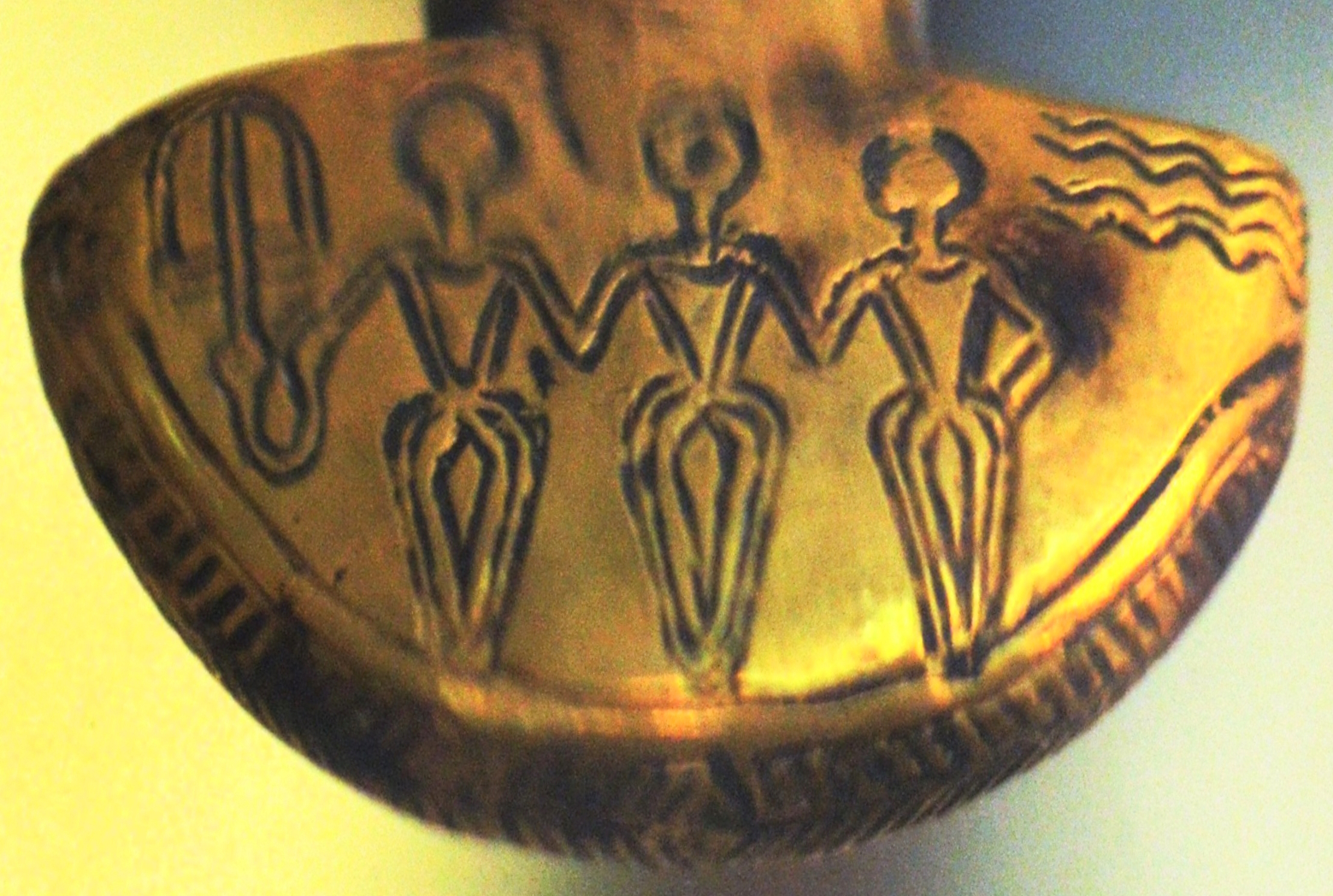
Flint knife gold handle, Naqada IID/IIIA. On the pommel, three women and a fan, next to a river. Gebelein, Cairo Museum, JE 34210.

Several gold objects are known from this period, sometimes decorated with motifs also found in decorated pottery. A flint knife with handle covered in gold has a one side a depiction of three women next to a river, one of them holding a fan, and on the reverse the depiction of a boat with two cabins.

During Naqada II, flint remained the main material for making tools such as knives, chisels, punches or scrappers, but such decorated knives were not in daily use, and probably had a religious function. The flint blade is a pseshkf, a blade shaped in the form of a fish tail, which became typical of knives used in the ceremony of the "Opening of the Mouth" in Classical times, where touching the mouth of a dead person with such a blade was supposed to make the jaw move. Gold remained a scarce and precious material, and was probably only used among the elite.

=== Oldest known Egyptian painted tomb and textiles ===
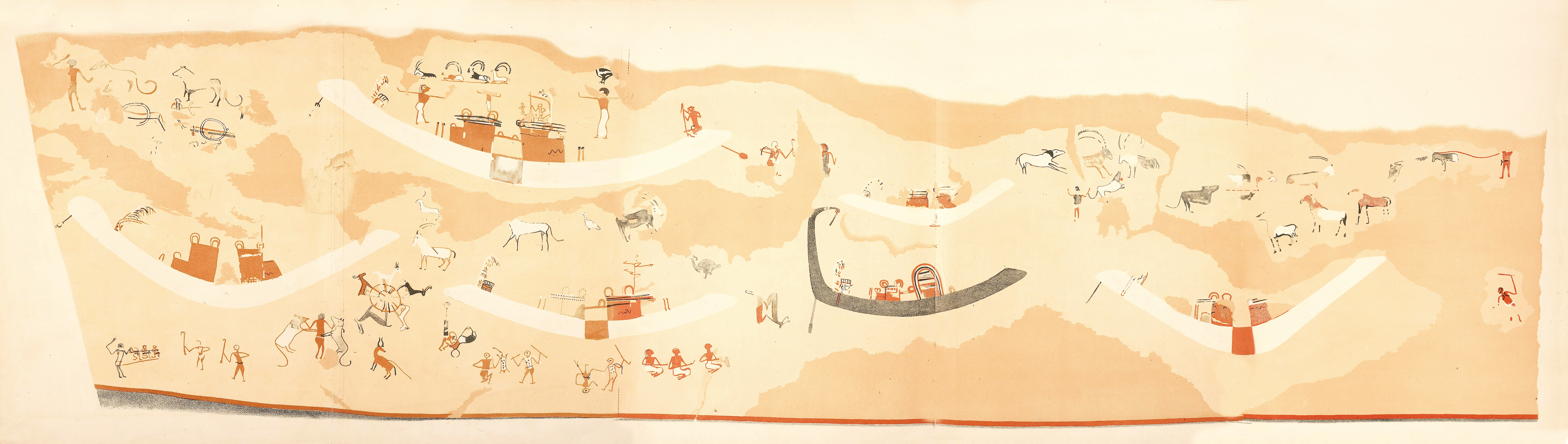
An ancient Nekhen tomb painting in plaster with barques, staffs, goddesses, and animals – possibly the earliest example of an Egyptian tomb mural

Discoveries at Nekhen (Hierakonpolis) include Tomb 100, the oldest known tomb with a mural painted on its plaster walls. The sepulchre is thought to date to the Naqada IIC phase (c. 3400–3300 BCE), and may belong to an early king of Hierakonpolis.

It is presumed that the mural shows religious scenes and images. It includes figures featured in Egyptian culture for three thousand years—a funerary procession of barques, presumably a goddess standing between two upright lionesses, a wheel of various horned quadrupeds, several examples of a staff that became associated with the deity of the earliest cattle culture and one being held up by a heavy-breasted goddess. Animals depicted include wild asses or zebras, ibexes, ostriches, lionesses, impalas, gazelles, and cattle.

Several of the images in the mural resemble images seen in the Gebel el-Arak Knife: a figure between two lions, warriors, or boats, but are not stylistically similar.

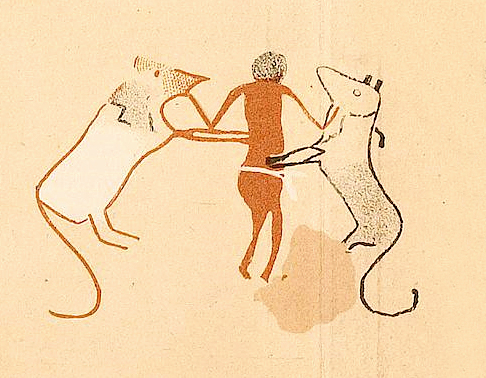
Figure with rampant lions

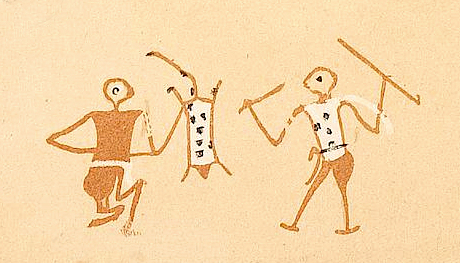
Presumed warriors

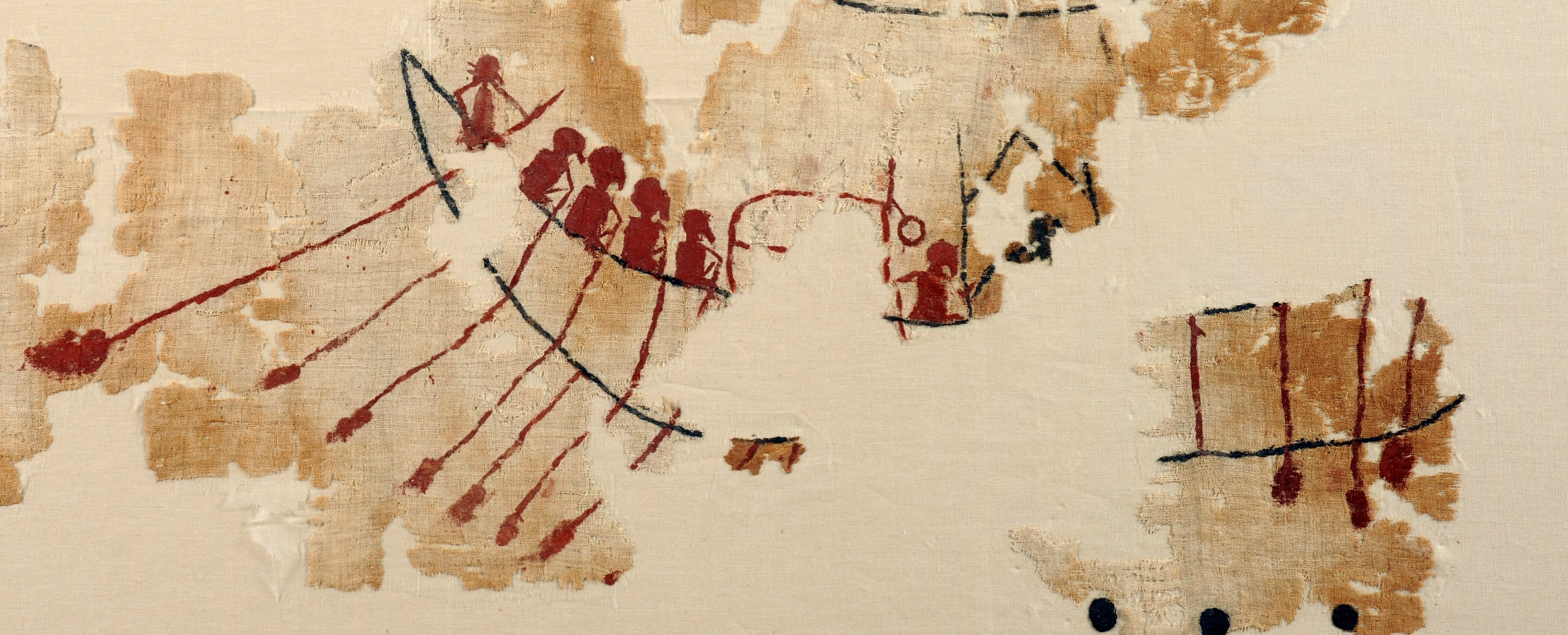
Painted linen (large boat detail) from a grave in Gebelein, 3450–3300 BC. Museo Egizio, Turin.

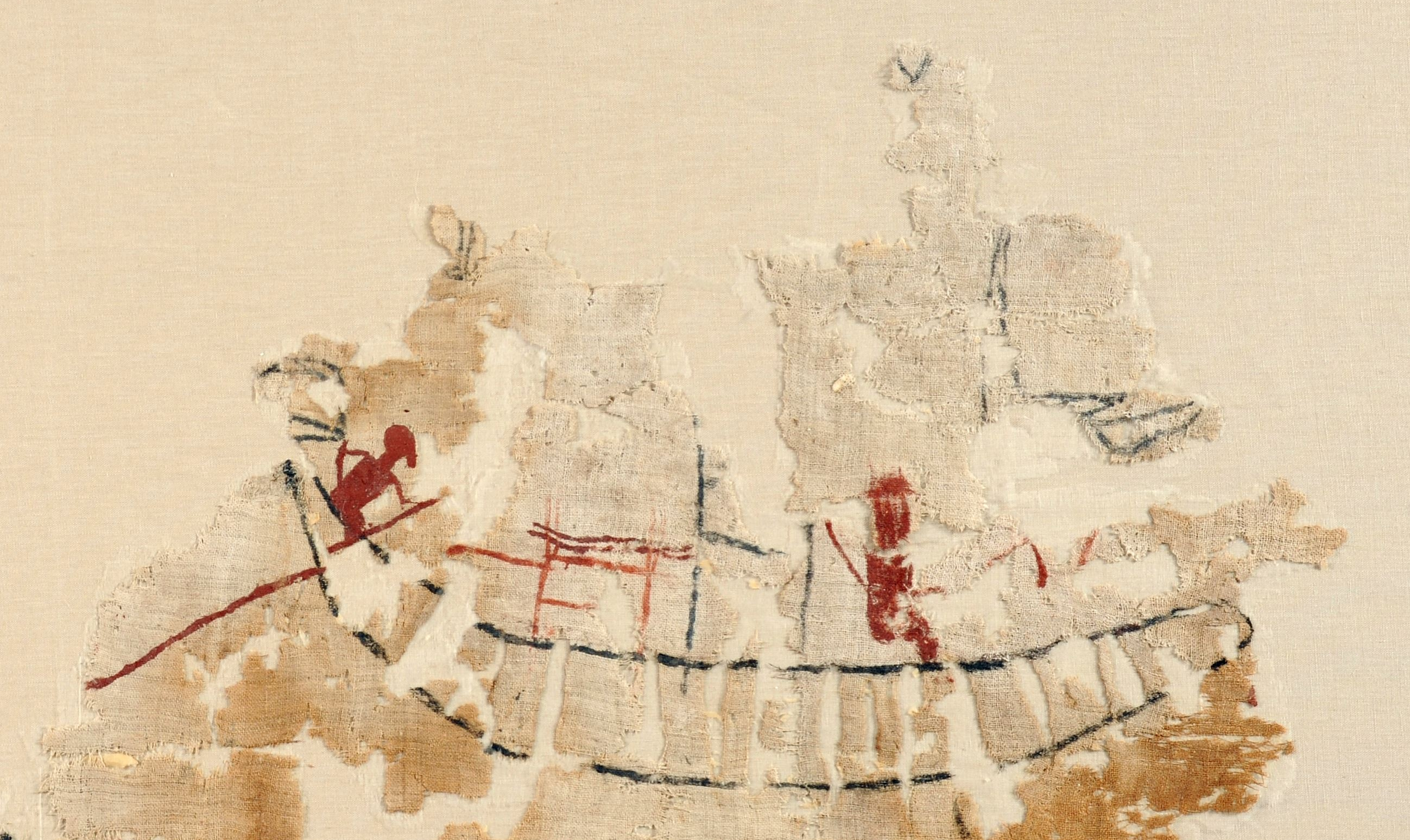
Painted linen (small boat detail) from a grave in Gebelein, 3450–3300 BC. Museo Egizio, Turin.

=== Proto-hieroglyphic symbols ===
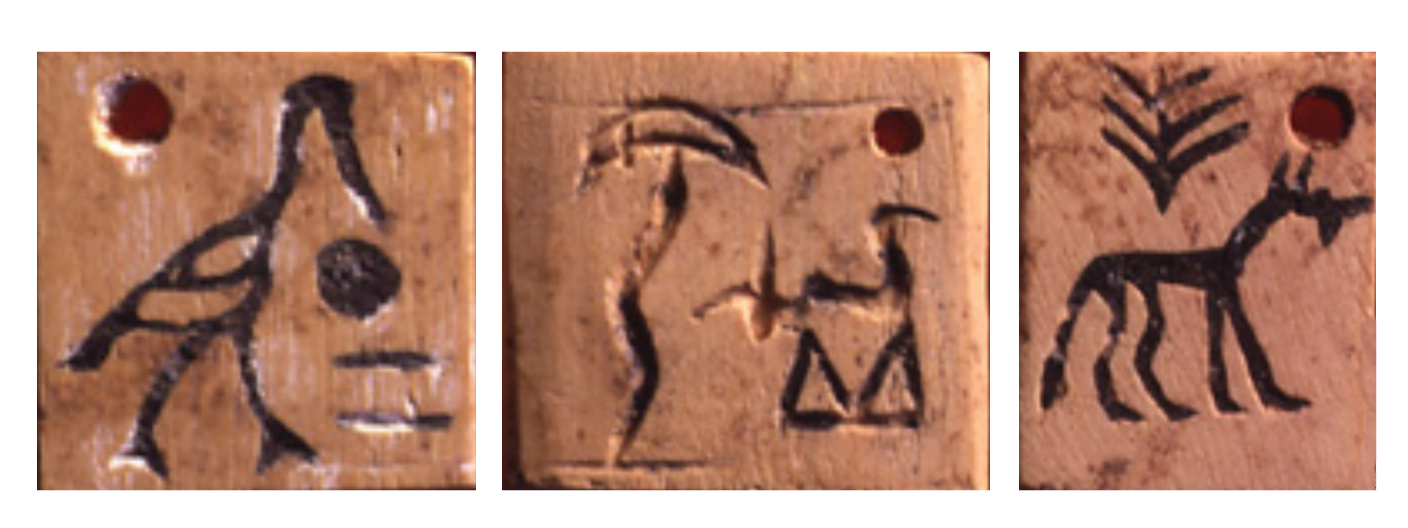
Designs on some of the labels or token from Cemetery U-j, Umm El Qa'ab, Abydos, carbon-dated to circa 3400–3200 BC.

Some symbols on Gerzeh pottery resemble traditional Egyptian hieroglyphs, which were contemporaneous with the proto-cuneiform script of Sumer. The figurine of a woman is a distinctive design considered characteristic of the culture.

On the Koptos monumental statues of the god Min, generally dated to circa 3300 BCE during the late Naqada II- early Naqada III periods, the Min symbol, an archaic form of the classical hieroglyph, is inscribed.

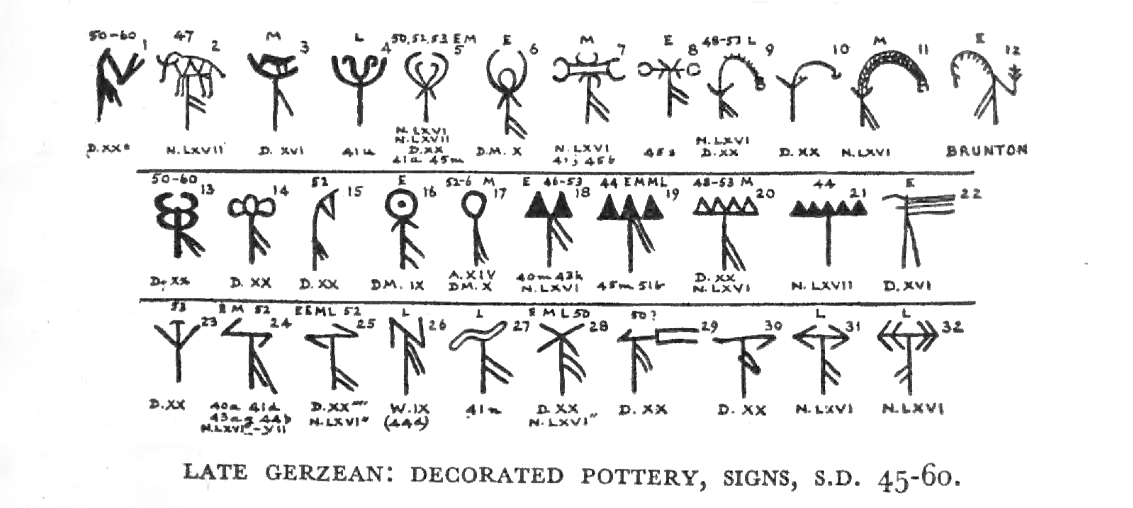
Late Gerzean decorated pottery signs

== Final period, Naqada IID (c.3300 BC) ==
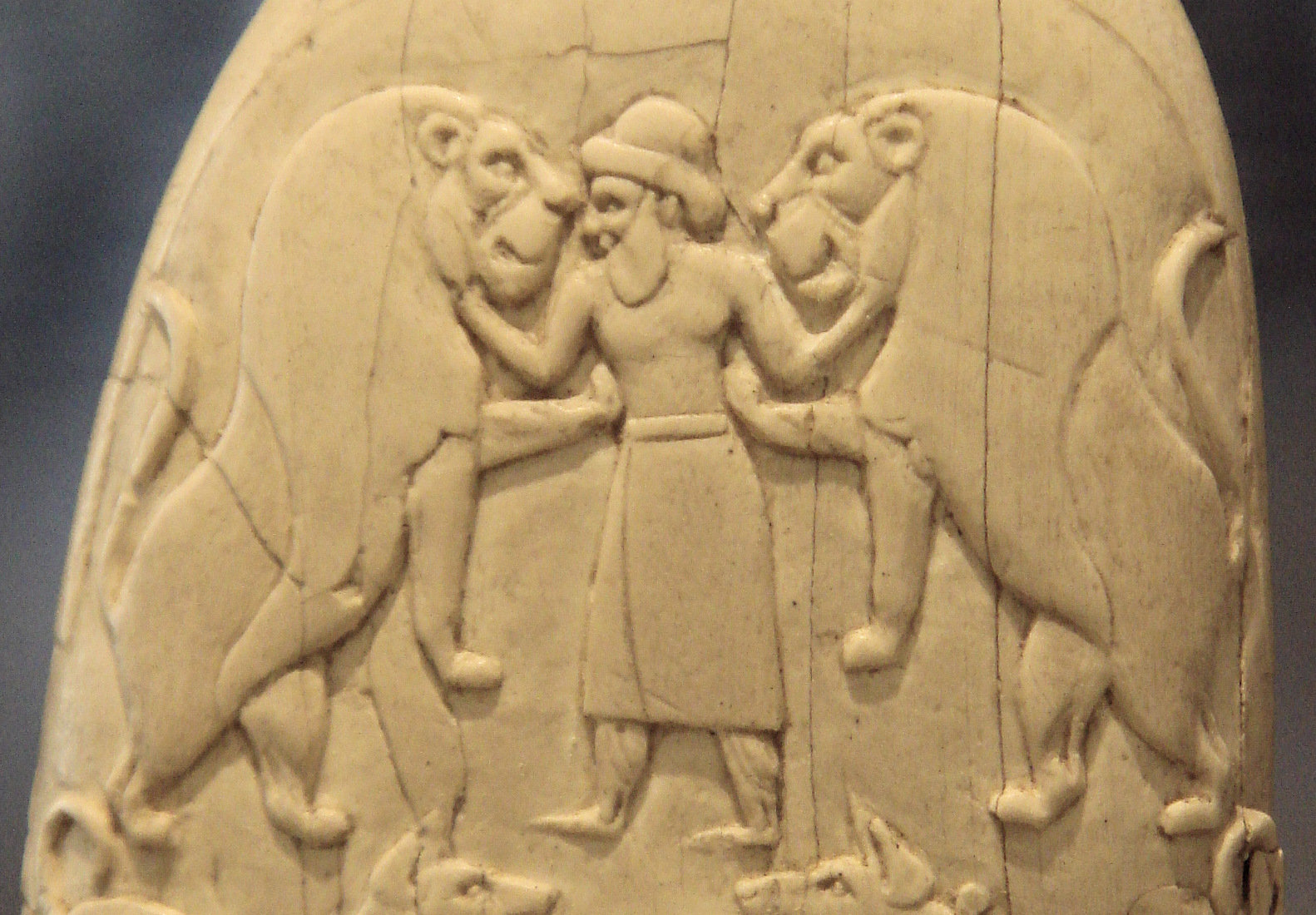
Likeness of a Mesopotamian king as Master of Animals on the Gebel el-Arak Knife, dated circa 3300–3200 BC, Abydos, Egypt. This artifact suggests the influence of Mesopotamia on Egypt at an early date, as part of ancient Egypt-Mesopotamia relations.

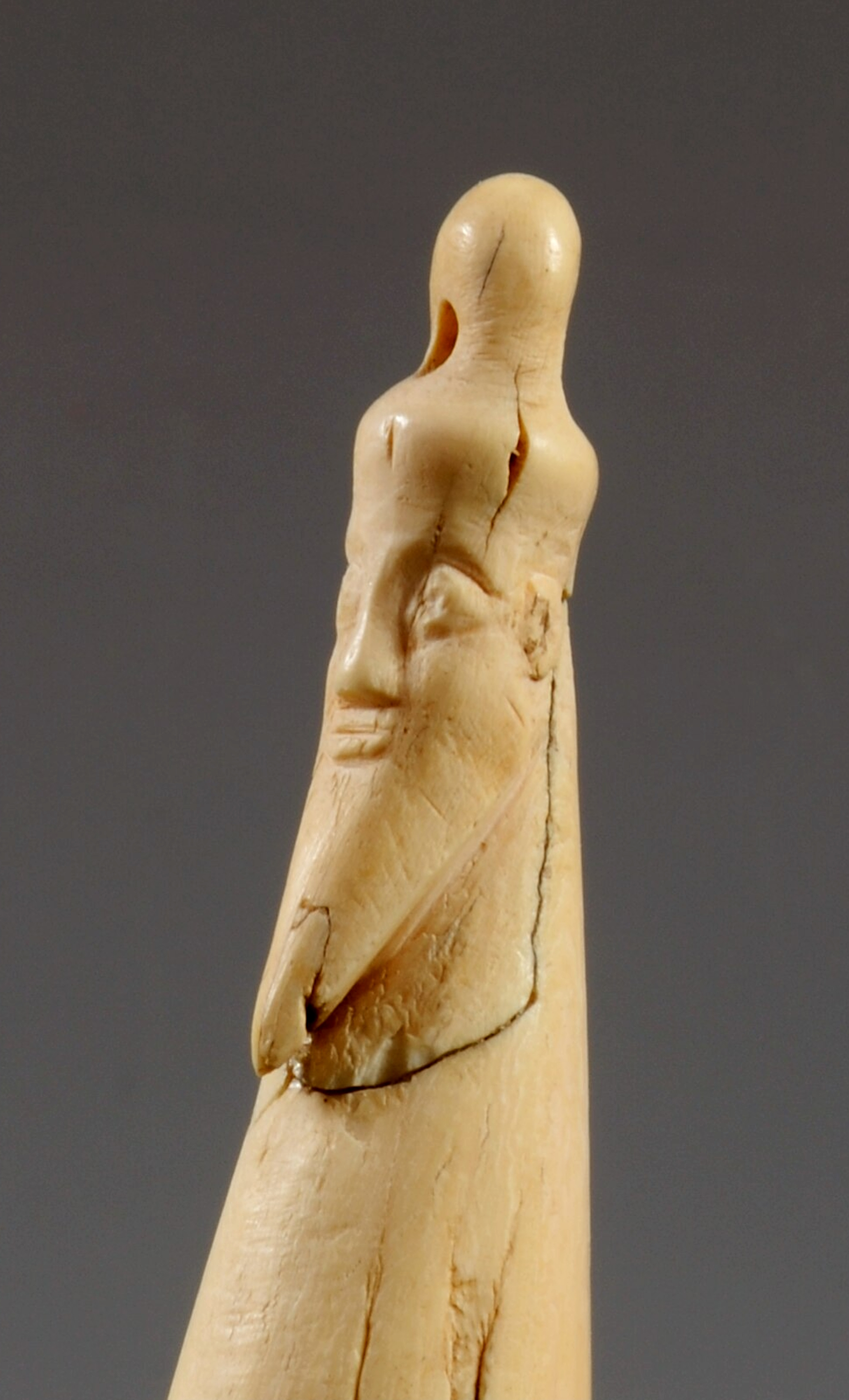
Hippopotamus tusk with realistic depictions of bearded man. Possibly Naqada IID, or earlier.

The period of Naqada IId (ca. 3350–3150 BCE) is thought to have been particularly in rich in rather revolutionary societal, artistic, and technological innovations, which culminated with the formation of Dynasty 0 (ca. 3150–3000 BCE) and the rise of the Egyptian Empire. The Naqada IId period is characterized by major accomplishments in the work of ivory, with small works of extraordinary quality, ceremonial knife handles, and decorated pottery. These accomplishments were accompanied by societal innovations, with the development of kingship, writing, and organized religion around clearly defined gods.

Ivory tusks with realistic depictions of bearded men may be attributable to this period, as late as Naqada IID, especially on stylistic grounds and based on the fact that they entirely disappear in the Naqada III period.

Territorial expansion into northern areas was confirmed during Naqada IID, with the occupation of major cemeteries and settlements in the Nile delta (Minshat Abu Omar, Kafr Hassan Daoud) and the replacement of the Maadi-Buto culture as seen Buto.

The period probably saw the development of city-states ruled by kings, such as Abydos and Hierakonpolis, resulting in conflicts in which Abydos was the final victor, thereby unifying Upper Egypt, as seen in the scenes of the Gebel el-Arak Knife, which likely depict the conflict between Abydos and Hierakonpolis. King Horus of Dynasty 0, would then endeavor to conquer the region of the Nile Delta.

=== Contacts with Western and Central Asia ===
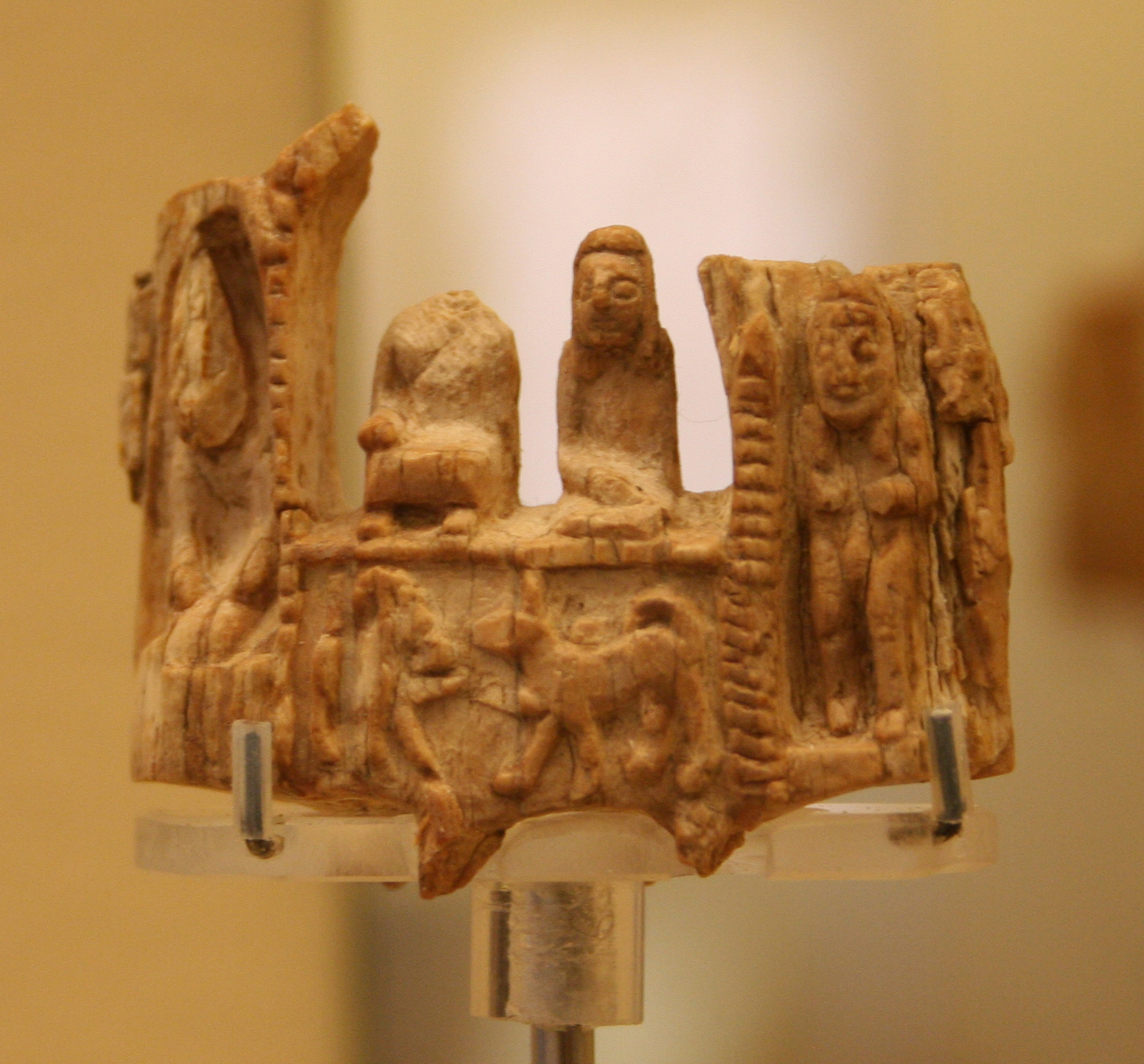
Enthronement scene, Hierakonpolis, likely Naqada IId (ca. 3350–3150 BCE). Staatliche Sammlung für Ägyptische Kunst.

Distinctly foreign objects and art forms entered Egypt during this period, indicating contacts with several parts of Asia. Scientific analysis of ancient wine jars in Abydos has shown that there was some high-volume wine trade with the Levant during this period. Objects such as the Gebel el-Arak knife handle, which has patently Mesopotamian relief carvings on it, have been found in Egypt, and the silver which appears in this period can only have been obtained from Asia Minor.

Lapis lazuli trade, in the form of beads, from its only known prehistoric source – Badakhshan in northeastern Afghanistan – also reached ancient Gerzeh.

These imports from Mesopotamia appear to have been quite intensive during the late Gerzean period, and correspond to the Protoliterate b and c cultures of Mesopotamia.

=== Warfare ===
Numerous scenes of warfare appear on decorated ivories of the period, especially on knife handles such as the Gebel el-Arak knife. The period has been characterized as a period of expansion and consolidation, establishing the basis for the formation of the Egyptian empire.

In the Gebel el-Arak knife, the fighting figurines are armed with flint knives, clubs and also pear-shaped maces, which are considered as an innovation introduced from Mesopotamia, replacing the initial Egyptian disk-shaped mace. Some authors have suggested that the reliefs represent a battle between warriors of the cities of Abydos and Hierakonpolis, the two main rival Egyptian cities of the period, and that the victor was Abydos. In effect, most of Egypt became unified under rulers from Abydos during the Naqada III period.

Another knife with very similar iconography, including depictions of warriors, prisoners and nearly identical types of ships can be seen in the Metropolitan Museum of Art (Accession number: 26.241.1). Numerous objects from the Naqada II period are similar to the Gebel el-Arak Knife in style and content.

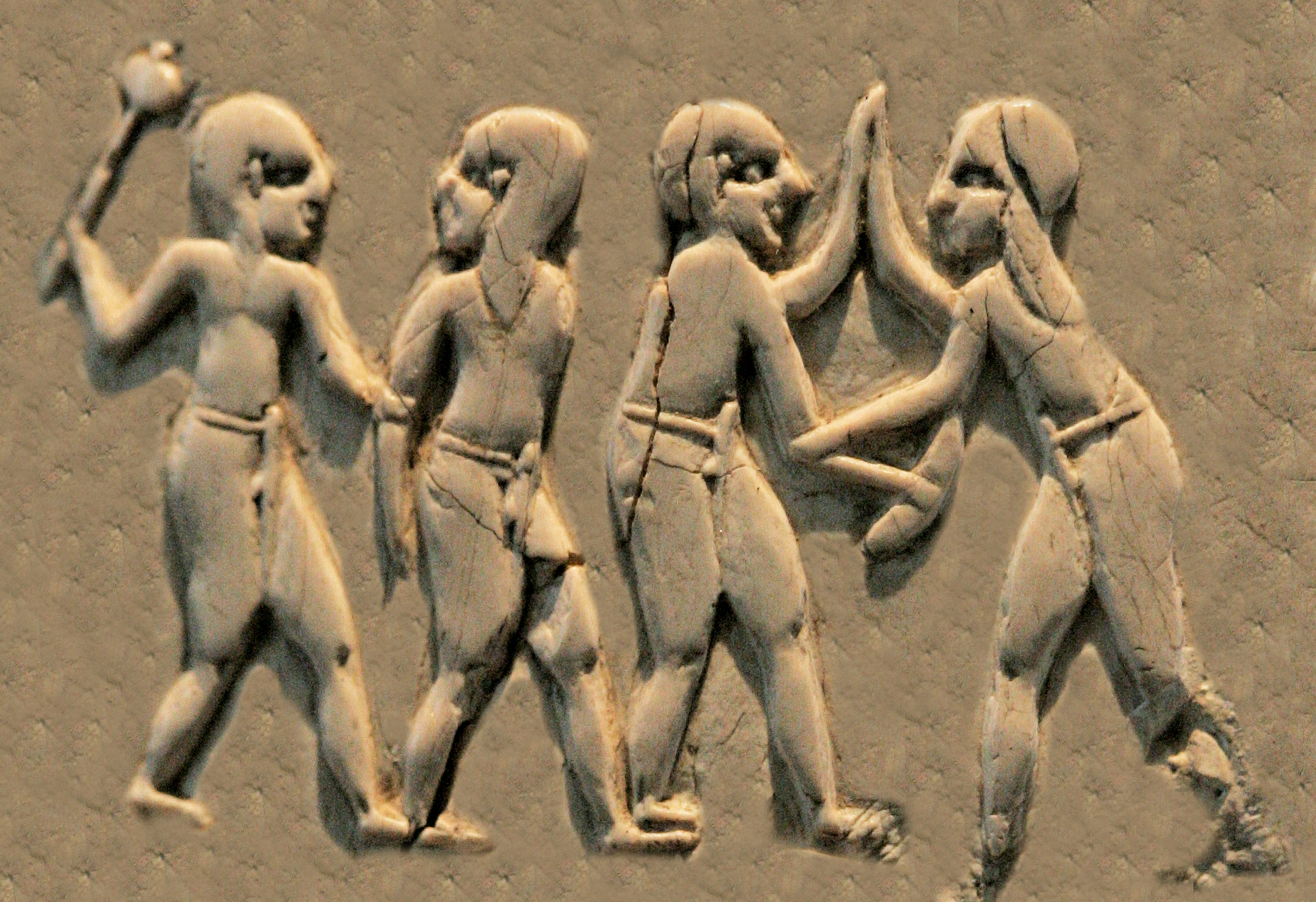
Gebel el-Arak Knife. Shaven-headed attackers armed with maces and knives, against unarmed opponents with long hair, all wearing penile sheaths.

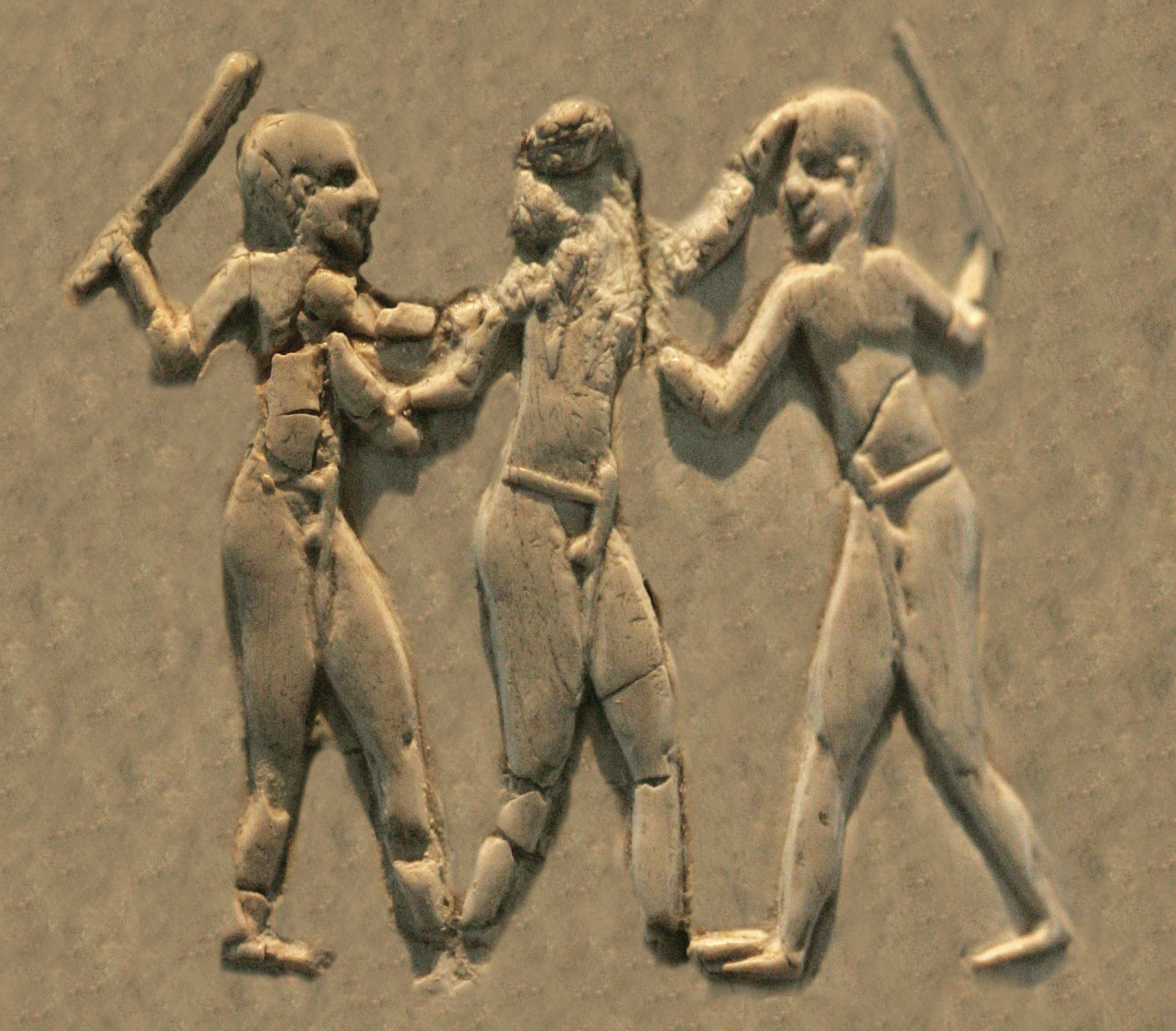
Gebel el-Arak Knife. Long-haired man (center) using a knife against shaven-headed baton-wielding enemies

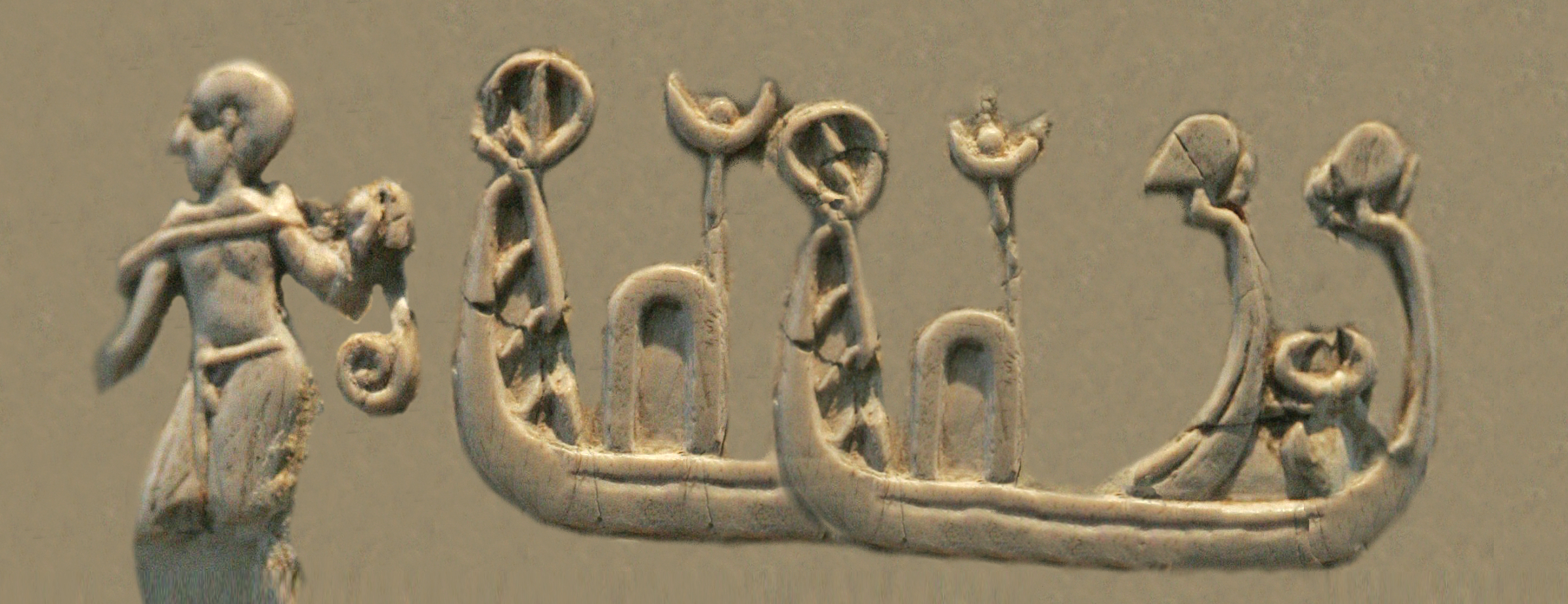
Gebel el-Arak Knife. Shaven-headed man towing high-prowed boats, of a type seen on Sumerian Uruk period seals and artworks (see example). Possibly part of the depiction of a naval battle.

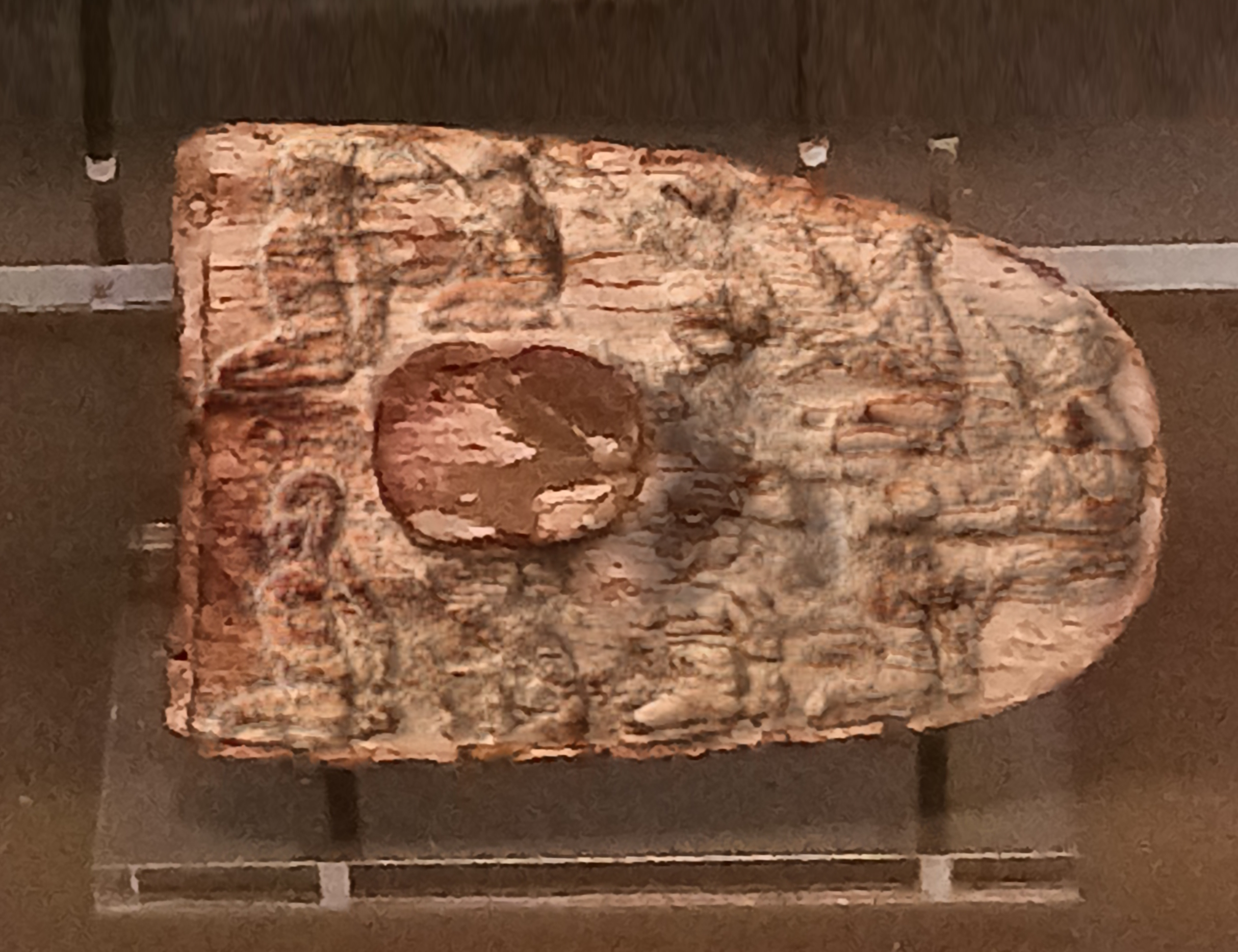
Ivory knife handle depicting rows of kneeling prisoners. Hierakonpolis. Nadaqa IID. Ashmolean Museum E.4975.

==== Maceheads ====
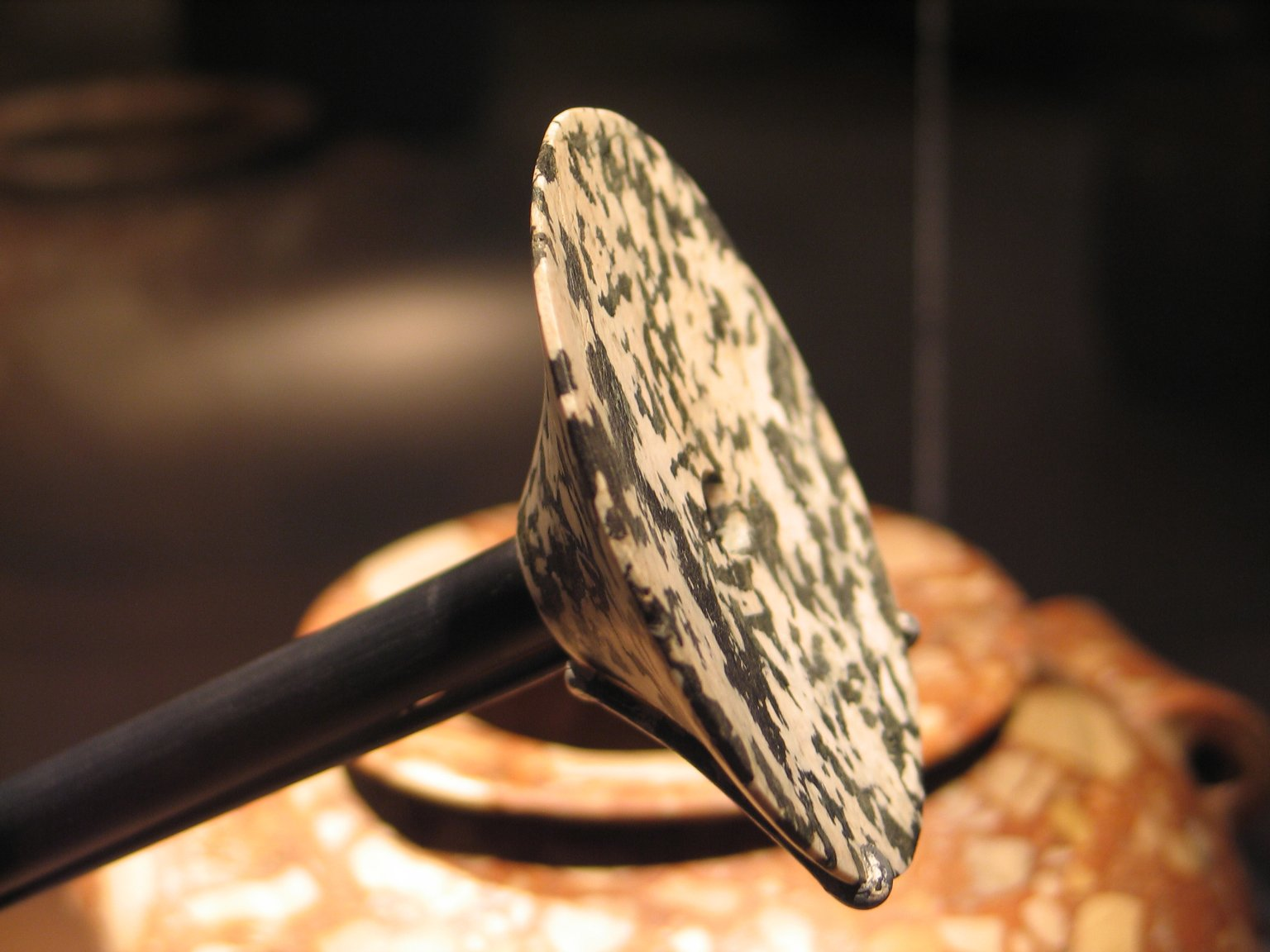
Egyptian disk-shaped macehead 4000–3400 BCE

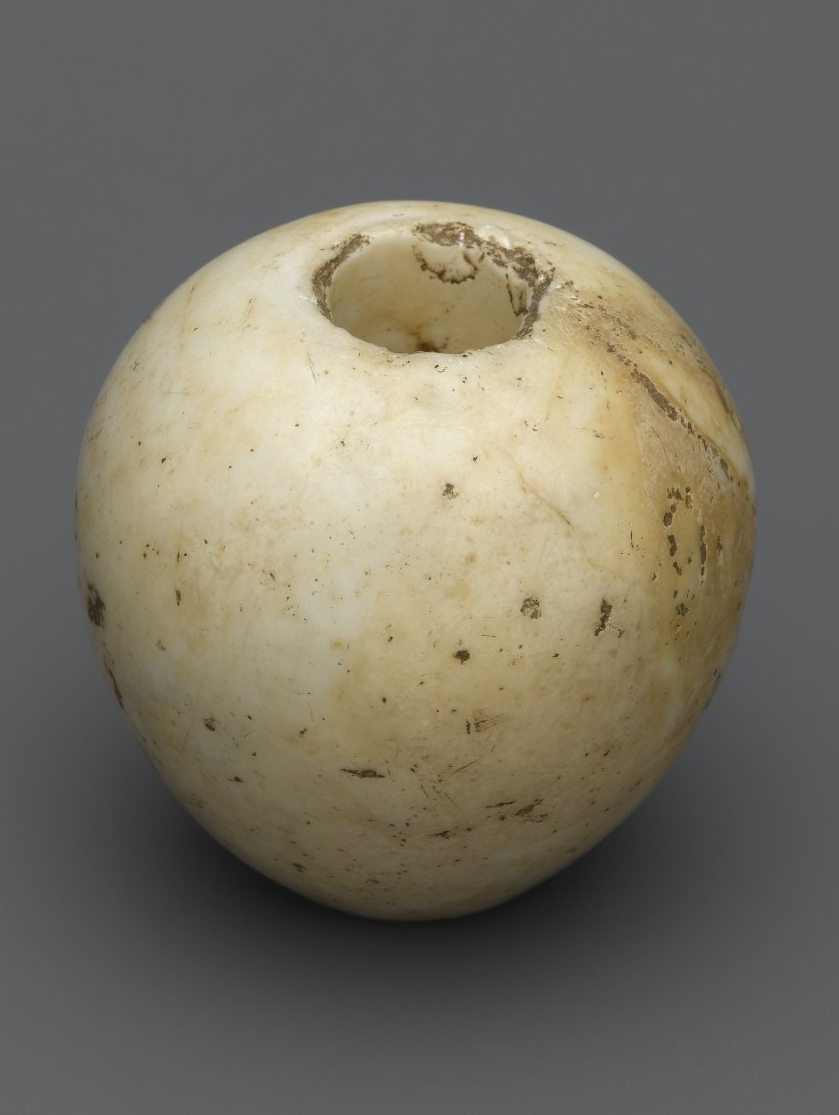
Egyptian macehead, 3500–3300 BCE

Egyptians used traditional disk-shaped maceheads during the early phase of Naqada culture, circa 4000–3400 BCE. At the end of the period, the disk-shaped macehead was replaced by the militarily superior Mesopotamian-style pear-shaped macehead as seen on the Narmer Palette. The Mesopotamian macehead was much heavier with a wider impact surface, and was capable of giving much more damaging blows than the original Egyptian disk-shaped macehead.

=== Cylinder seals ===
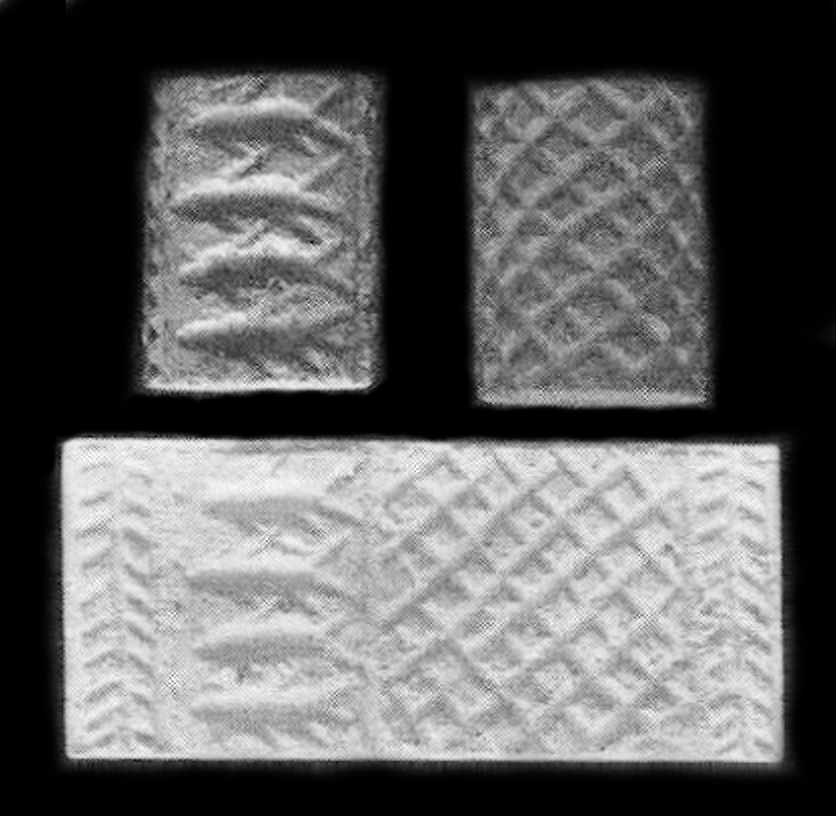
Jemdet Nasr-style Mesopotamian cylinder seal, from Grave 7304 Cemetery 7000 at Naqada, Naqada II period.

It is generally thought that cylinder seals were introduced from Mesopotamia to Egypt during the Naqada II period. Cylinder seals, some coming from Mesopotamia and Elam, and some made locally in Egypt following Mesopotamian designs in a stylized manner, have been discovered in the tombs of Upper Egypt dating to Naqada II and III, particularly in Hierakonpolis. Mesopotamia cylinder seals have been found in the Gerzean context of Naqada II, in Naqada and Hiw, attesting to the expansion of the Jemdet Nasr culture as far as Egypt at the end of the 4th millennium BC.

In Egypt, cylinder seals suddenly appear without local antecedents from around Naqada II c-d (3500–3300 BC). The designs are similar to those of Mesopotamia, where they were invented during the early 4th millennium BC, during the Uruk period, as an evolutionary step from various accounting systems and seals going back as early as the 7th millennium BC. The earliest Egyptian cylinder seals are clearly similar to contemporary Uruk seals down to Naqada II-d (circa 3300 BC), and may even have been manufactured by Mesopotamian craftsman, but they start to diverge from circa 3300 BC to become more Egyptian in character. Cylinder seals were made in Egypt as late as the Second Intermediate Period, but they were essentially replaced by scarabs from the time of the Middle Kingdom.

=== Religion ===
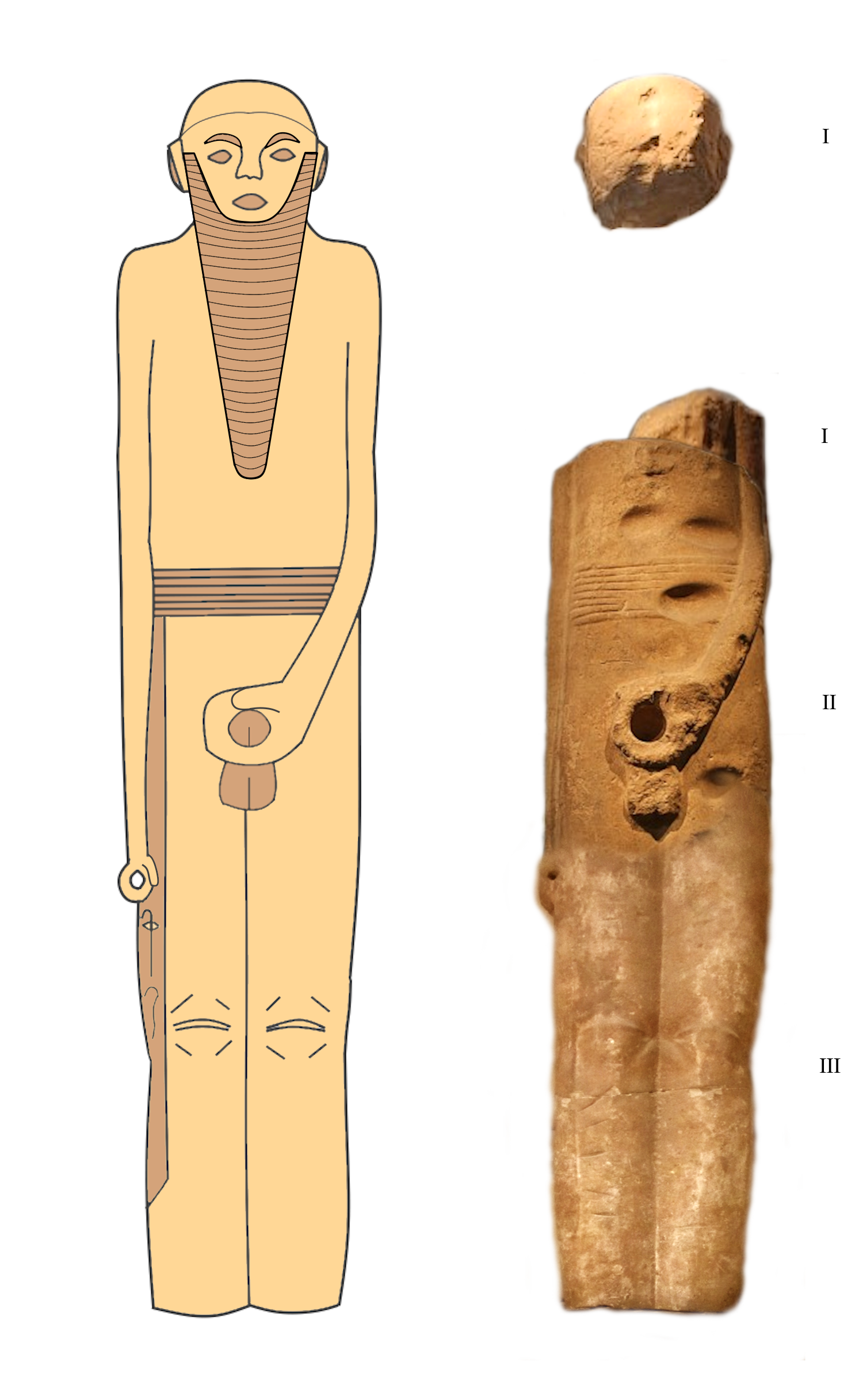
Reconstruction of the Koptos colossi, pre-dynastic colossal statues of the God Min, Koptos, Late Naqada II- Early Naqada III, about 3300 BCE.

The worship of nameless supernatural powers, numina, may go back thousands of years before Naqada, mainly revolving around the worship of supernatural beasts, votive figurines, or bearded human effigies. Organized religion however seems to first appear during Naqada IID, with images of the goddess Bat and possibly the fertility god Min, both symbolized by proto-hieroglyphic signs.

Bat appears as a cloaked female, with cow horns and surrounding stars, a possible symbol of divinity similar to the dingir of Mesopotamian culture. The first image specifically identifying Bat is a Naqada IID greywacke palette from Gerzeh. She appears as a cloaked, horned female. She has extended arms and a star replaces her head and her hands. She has two additional stars at her waist. This exact motif is also known from other contemporary artifacts. Bat can also be shown symbolically as a bovine head with human shoulders.

The first known depictions of the Egyptian god of fertility Min, appear in the form of monumental statues discovered in an ancient temple at Koptos, dated to the late Naqada II to early Naqada III periods, and now displayed in the Ashmolean Museum following their discovery by Flinders Petrie in Koptos at the end of the 19th century. The estimated size of the three known statues ranges from 372 cm to 403 cm. The statues show a bearded man, naked but for a belt and a sash, holding his erect penis. An early form of the character for "Min" is inscribed on the side of one of these statues.

On the Koptos monumental statues of Min, generally dated to circa 3300 BCE during the late Naqada II- early Naqada III periods, the Min symbol is inscribed, together with marine objects: the "sword" of a sawfish and two shells of the Pterocera species of conchs. These symbols seem to corroborate the traditional origin histories of the god, according to which he originated in the fabulous "Land of Punt", in the Eritrean region bordering on the Red Sea.

The Koptos colossi are "remarkably similar" to the much earlier Pre-Pottery Neolithic A statues of northern Mesopotamia, dating to circa 9,000 BCE, such as the Urfa Man (a sculpture from a Pre-Pottery Neolithic temple at Yeni Mahalle), or the Adiyaman-Kilisik sculpture. They share the same hieratic construction and phallic emphasis. According to Ian Hodder, the cult of the Egyptian god Min is related to the Middle East and goes back millennia.

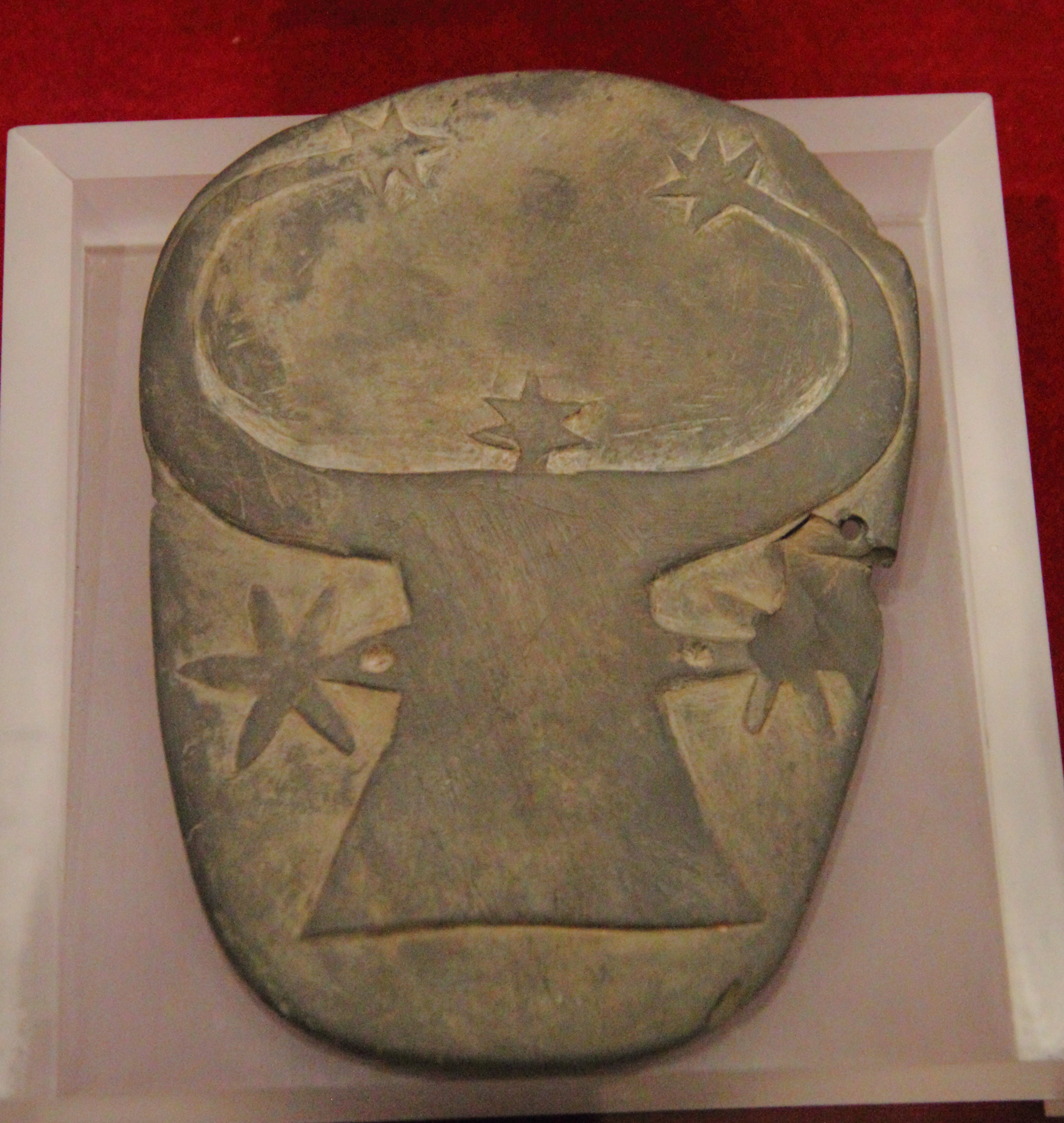
The famous "Hathor palette", or "Bat palette" from Tomb 59 of Gerzeh, Naqada IId.

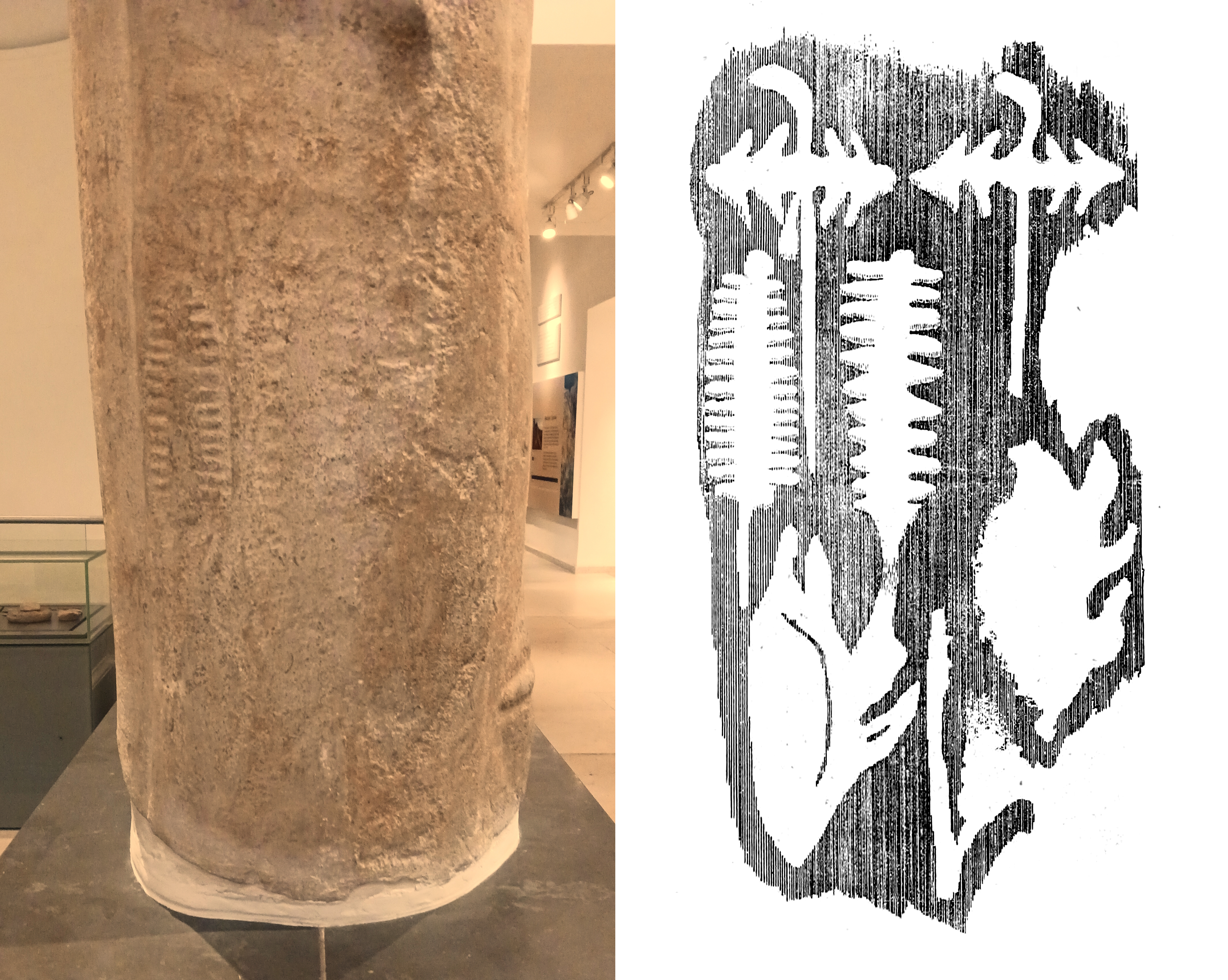
Engravings with the character for Min, with swordfish blades and sea shells, on one of the Koptos Temple statues.

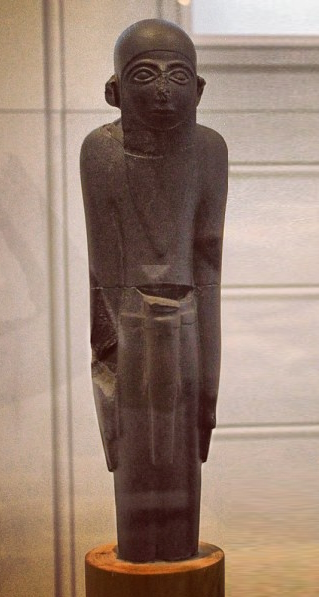
The stylistically similar "MacGregor Man", with long beard and penile sheath.

== See also ==
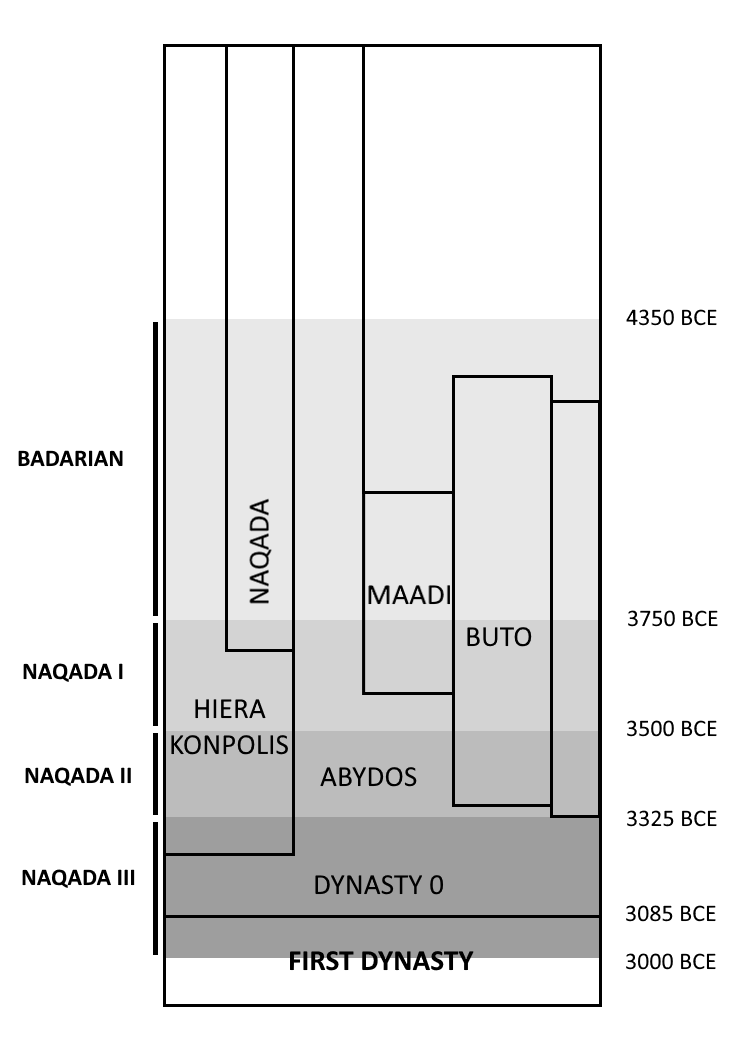
Chronology of state formation in Ancient Egypt.

- Riqqeh

== Sources ==
- Dee, Michael W.; Wengrow, David; Shortland, Andrew J.; Stevenson, Alice; Brock, Fiona; Bronk Ramsey, Christopher (June 2014). "Radiocarbon dating and the Naqada relative chronology". Journal of Archaeological Science. 46. doi:10.1016/j.jas.2014.03.016.
- Patch, Diana Craig; Eaton-Krauss, Marianne (2011). Dawn of Egyptian art. New York : New Haven: Metropolitan Museum of Art; Distributed by Yale University Press. ISBN 978-0300179521.

== Bibliography ==
- Petrie/Wainwright/Mackay: The Labyrinth, Gerzeh and Mazghuneh, British School of Archaeology in Egypt XXI. London 1912
- Alice Stevenson: Gerzeh, a cemetery shortly before History (Egyptian sites series), London 2006, ISBN 0-9550256-5-6
