= NIM =

Nim is a mathematical two player game.

Nim or NIM may also refer to:

- Nim (programming language)
- Nim Chimpsky, a signing chimpanzee
- Nim (name), name list

== Acronyms ==
- Negative index metamaterial, a metamaterial which can direct and regulate wave propagation due to its negative refractive index
- Net interest margin, a measure of banking performance
- Network Installation Manager, an IBM framework
- Nigerian Institute of Management, a professional association
- Nuclear Instrumentation Module, a standard for electronics modules
- Nuclear Instruments and Methods in Physics Research, a scientific journal
- Diori Hamani International Airport (IATA code), Niamey, Niger

== See also ==
- Nym (disambiguation)
- NIMH (disambiguation)
- NIMS (disambiguation)
