= Min =

Min or MIN may refer to:

== Places ==
- Fujian, also called Mǐn, a province of China
  - Min Kingdom (909–945), a state in Fujian
- Min County, a county of Dingxi, Gansu province, China
- Min River (Fujian)
- Min River (Sichuan)
- Mineola (Amtrak station), station code MIN

== People ==
=== Personal names ===
- Min (Korean surname), a Korean surname
- Min (surname) (闵/閔), a Chinese surname
- Min (Korean given name), a Korean given name

=== Individuals with the name ===
- Min (Vietnamese singer) (born 1988)
- Pechaya Wattanamontree (born 1989), Thai actress
- Min (South Korean singer) (born 1991), South Korean singer, songwriter and actress Lee Min-young
- Min (treasurer), ancient Egyptian official
- Min, Marquis of Jin (died 678 BC), Chinese monarch
- Min (god), Egyptian god of reproduction
- Empress Myeongseong (1851–1895), informally Queen Min, empress of Joseon
- Menes or Min (a spelling variant no longer accepted), an early Egyptian pharaoh
- Min Hogg (born 1939), British journalist and magazine editor
- Min, a character from Barney & Friends played by Pia Hamilton from 1992 to 1995
- Min Hael Cassidy, a character from the 2021 animated TV series Dino Ranch
- Min Harper, a character in Slow Horses
- Min Pak, a fictional character from the animated series Wylde Pak
- Elmindreda "Min" Farshaw, a character in the Wheel of Time fantasy series

=== Groups of people ===
- Min Chinese speakers, a subgroup of Chinese peoples who speak Min Chinese
- Mountain Ok people or Min peoples, West Sepik Province of Papua New Guinea

== Computing and technology ==
- Mobile identification number
- Multistage interconnection networks, a class of high-speed computer networks

== Languages ==
- Min Chinese, a group of Chinese languages
- Minangkabau language, ISO 639-2 code min, an Austronesian language, spoken by the Minangkabau of West Sumatra

== Measures ==
- Minimum, abbreviated min.
- Minute, abbreviated min, a unit of time
- Minute of arc, abbreviated min, a unit of angular measurement

== Other uses ==
- Min (ship), replica of an Ancient Egyptian ship
- Mašinska Industrija Niš, or MIN, a Serbian company
- Abbreviation used in sports results for Minneapolis–Saint Paul’s major professional sports teams
  - Minnesota Vikings of the National Football League
  - Minnesota Timberwolves of the National Basketball Association
  - Minnesota Wild of the National Hockey League
  - Minnesota Twins of Major League Baseball
- Minister (government), commonly abbreviated Min.
- Minuth or Min, a type of heresy in Judaism
- Abbreviation for a mortgage identification number, an identifier created by Mortgage Electronic Registration Systems

== See also ==
- Meen (disambiguation)
- Mina (disambiguation)
- Minh (disambiguation)
- Minn (disambiguation)
- Myn (disambiguation)
