= NIMS =

NIMS may refer to:

- National Incident Management System, used in the United States to coordinate emergency preparations and responses
- National Institute for Materials Science, a Japanese research institution
- National Institute for Mathematical Sciences, a South Korean research institution
- Near-Infrared Mapping Spectrometer, a device on the spacecraft Galileo
- New Indian Model School, a group of schools in United Arab Emirates
- Nihon Institute of Medical Science, a medical university in Saitama, Japan
- NIMS University in Jaipur, India
- Nizam's Institute of Medical Sciences, a medical university in Telangana, India
- NUST Business School (formerly NUST Institute of Management Sciences), Pakistan

Nims may refer to:

- Nims (river), in Rhineland-Palatinate, Germany, left tributary of the Prüm
- Arthur Nims (1923–2019), United States Tax Court judge
- Daryl Nims (1923–1996), American politician in Iowa
- John Frederick Nims (1913–1999), American poet
- Kenny Nims (born 1987), American lacrosse player
- Nirmal Purja, Nepalese mountaineer known as Nims

== See also ==
- NIM (disambiguation)
- NIMH (disambiguation)
