= Min River =

Min River or Minjiang may refer to:

- Min River (Sichuan) (岷江), in Sichuan, China
- Min River (Fujian) (闽江), in Fujian, China

== See also ==
- Min (disambiguation)
