= Minnefer =

Ancient Egyptian official

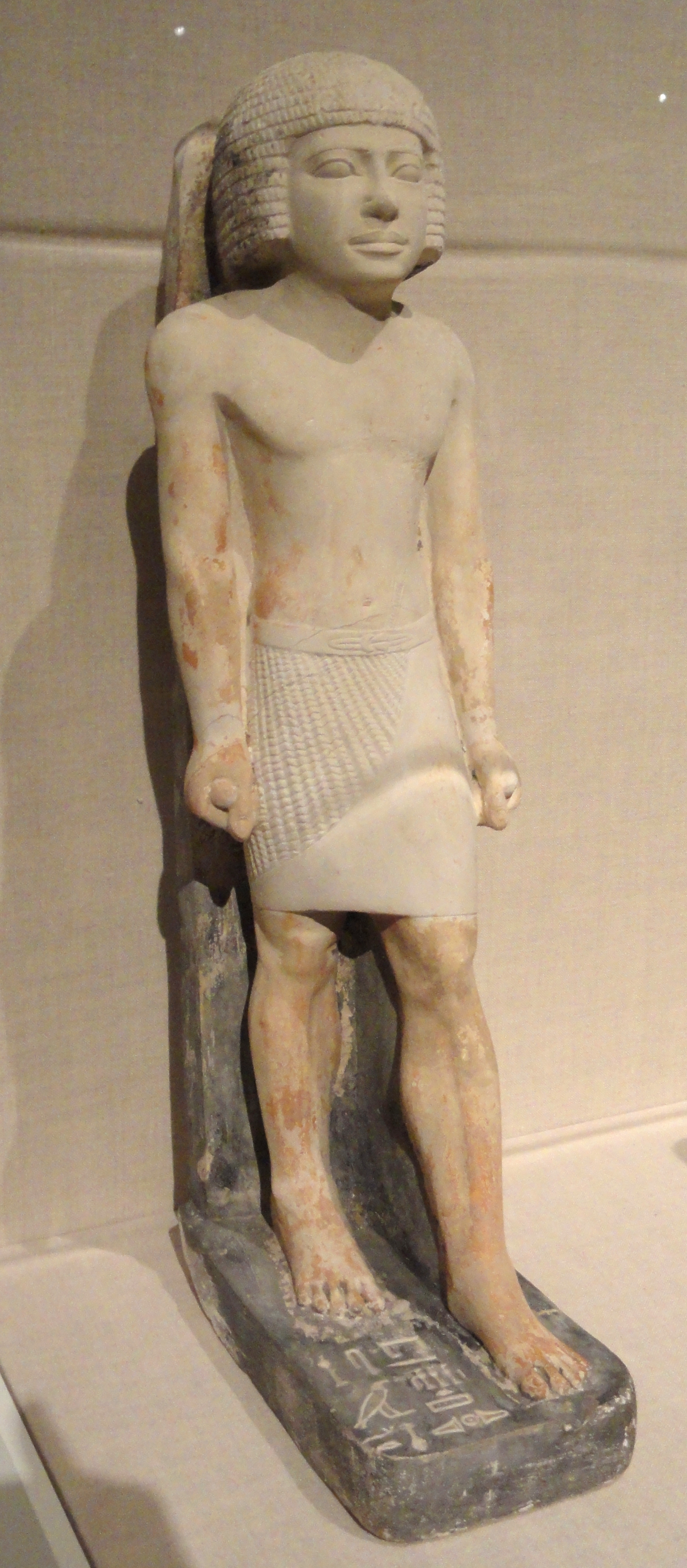
Statue of Minnefer in Cleveland

Minnefer (also Min-Nefer, meaning "Min is perfect") was a Supervisor of Palace Attendants and Overseer of Messengers during the Fifth Dynasty of Egypt. He was buried in a mastaba in Giza. When it was excavated, his tomb still housed four statues of Minnefer. One of these is now in the Cleveland Museum of Art and shows him standing with left foot forward, clenched fists and his back to a wall. The other three statues, all broken, are in the Museum of Fine Arts, Boston.
