= Kilisik sculpture =

Limestone figure found in Kâhta District, Turkey

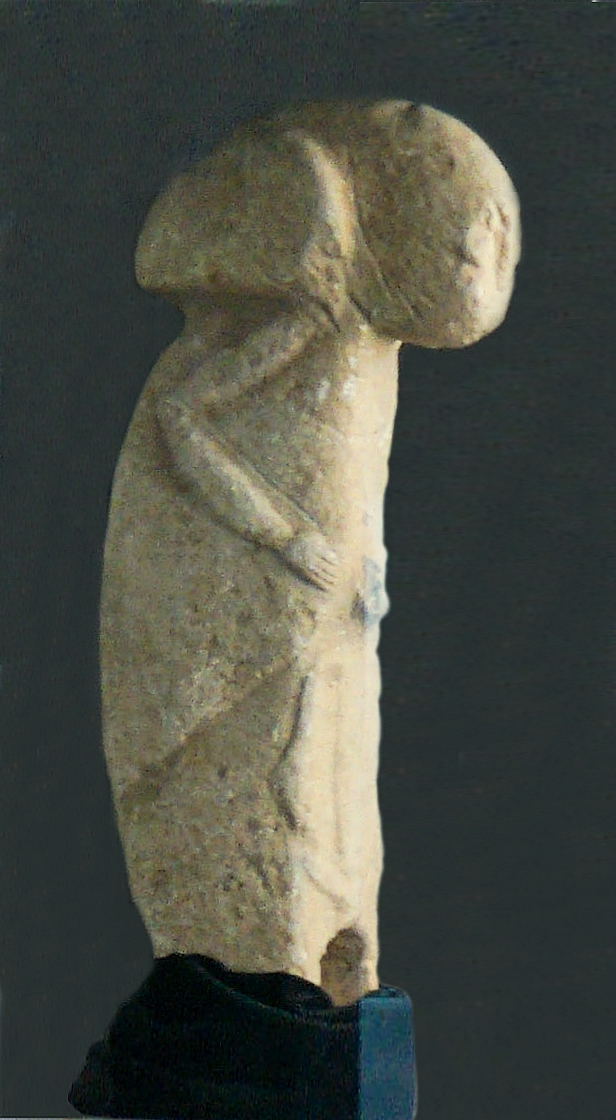
Original Adiyaman-Kilisik sculpture, Pre-Pottery Neolithic B, tentatively to 7500-7000 BCE. Adıyaman Archaeological Museum.

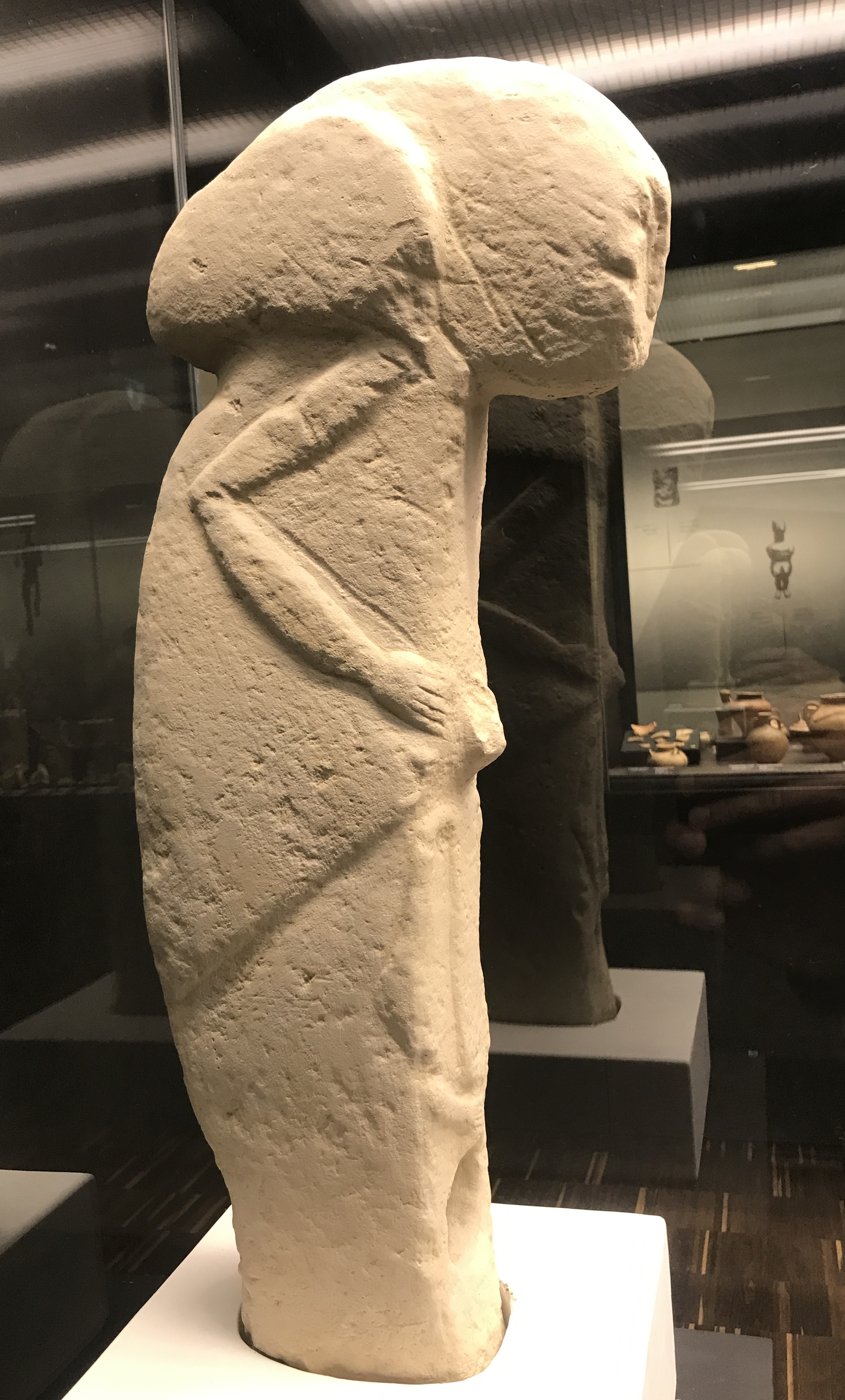
Cast of the Kilisik sculpture. Archäologisches Museum der WWU Münster

The Kilisik sculpture, or Adıyaman-Kilisik sculpture, is a limestone monumental androgynous figure, found in the Kilisik hamlet of Çıraklık village in Kâhta District, near Adiyaman at the foot of the Taurus Mountains, in 1965. The location is about 30 km north of Nevalı Çori. It is now in the Adıyaman Archaeological Museum.

The statue is 80 cm high, and dates to the Pre-Pottery Neolithic B, tentatively to 7500-7000 BCE. The base is broken, and the complete statue could have been about 3 meters high, like the other T-shaped statues at Göbekli Tepe and Nevalı Çori.

The statue shares characteristics with the "T"-shaped stelae with arms on the sides excavated at sites like Göbekli Tepe and Nevalı Çori, and with the statues discovered at the "Taş Tepeler" sites of Göbekli Tepe, Nevalı Çori, Karahan Tepe, or Sanlıurfa-Yeni Mahalle.

The arms join at the front, with hands properly shaped with fingers, over a penis, or the small relief of a human, possibly a child. Below the "child" is a hole, which could symbolize a vagina. This may thus represent a woman or a goddess giving birth. These are some facial features, including a long broad nose.

The statue, if indeed depicting a woman and a child, may be paralleled with some totem-pole statues found in Nevali Cori and Göbekli Tepe. It could also have phallic symbolism, and a phallus could have been inserted in the hole at the bottom.

This statue tends to confirm that the "T-shaped" stelae are anthropomorphic, and perhaps also phallic. These characteristics are similar to the statues of the Egyptian god Min, and in particular the Koptos colossi, although separated in time by several millennia.

== Sources ==
- Çelik, Bahattin (2005). "A New Statue of the Early Pre-Pottery Neolithic Period from Gaziantep, Southeastern Turkey". Neo-Lithics 1/05.
- Hodder, Ian (30 August 2010). Religion in the Emergence of Civilization: Çatalhöyük as a Case Study. Cambridge University Press. pp. 37–38. ISBN 978-1-139-49217-1.
- Verhoeven, Marc (2000). "Person or Penis? Interpreting a 'New' PPNB Anthropomorphic Statue from the Taurus Foothills" (PDF). Neo-Lithics 1/01.
- Ziffer, Irit (2007). "The First Adam, Androgyny, and the 'Ain Ghazal Two-headed Busts". Israel Exploration Journal. 57 (2).
