= Myn =

Myn or MYN may refer to:

- Myn Hoffman (1883-1951), fourth Superintendent of the United States Navy Nurse Corps
- MYN, Station code for Merlynston railway station, in Melbourne, Victoria, Australia
- MYN, ICAO Code for Mayan World Airlines, headquartered in Guatemala
- MYN IATA Code for Marib Airport, in Yemen

== See also ==
- Myn Bala, 2011 Kazakh historical dramatic film
- Min (disambiguation)
- Minn (disambiguation)
- Nym (disambiguation)
