= Minn (disambiguation) =

Minn is an abbreviation for the U.S. state of Minnesota.

Minn may also refer to:

- Minn of the Mississippi, 1951 children's book
- Kyaw Zwar Minn (born 1958), Burmese diplomat
- Minn Latt (1925–1985), Burmese writer

== See also ==
- Min (disambiguation)
- Myn (disambiguation)
