= Min symbol (hieroglyph) =

Egyptian hieroglyph

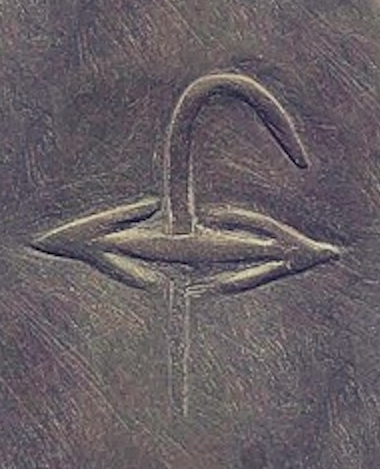
Min symbol (on the Min palette). Late Predynastic Egypt, Naqada III. 3250-3100 BCE. El-Amra

The Min symbol, or Emblem of Min, is a typographic ligature of two Egyptian hieroglyphs used to designate the ancient Egyptian god of fertility Min:

R23

two opposing-faced arrows

S39

a vertical "crook" or staff

== Etymology ==
The horizontal form of the Min symbol, (consisting of two opposing-faced arrows), is shown on the Min Palette in an archaic form. Centered vertically overlaying the Min hieroglyph is a vertical "crook" or staff, the version of the 'straight staff' (see Crook-staff (Luwian hieroglyph)).

The symbol appears on the Min Palette, a Late Predynastic, Naqada III palette, dating to 3250-3100 BCE, from El-Amra.

According to Budge, the curved staff may symbolically represent the male organ, and the double arrows the female organ. Wainwright suggested that the double-arrow was the symbol of a thunderbolt, similar to the symbols of storm gods as seen in the ancient Near East and in the Hittite world.

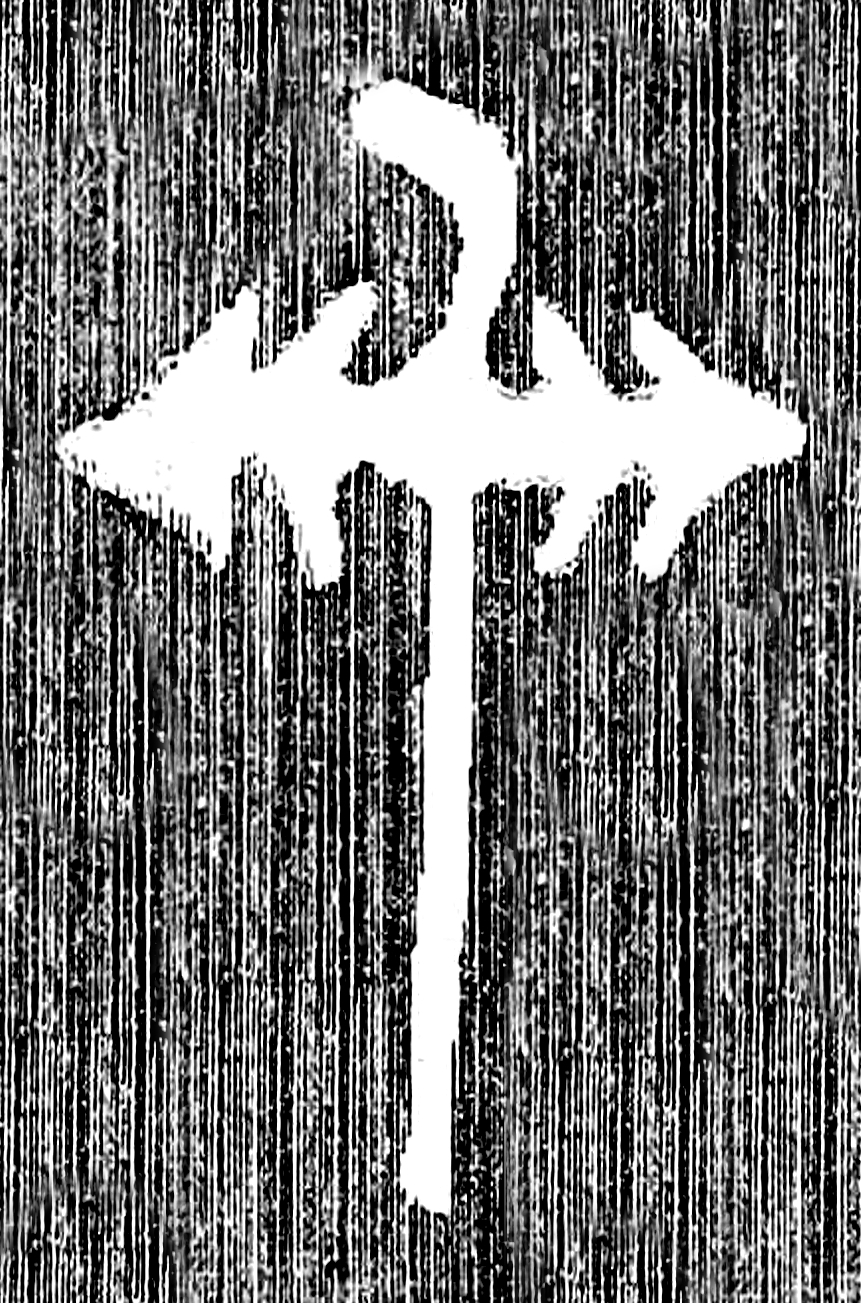
Min symbol on the Koptos colossi, c.3300 BCE

It also appears as inscriptions on early monumental statues of the Koptos colossi, predecessors of god Min from Koptos, dated to circa 3300 BCE. In these statues, the Min symbol is accompanied marine objects: the "sword" of a sawfish and two shells of the Pterocera species. These symbols seem to corroborate the traditional origin histories of the god, according to which he originated in the fabulous "Land of Punt", in the Eritrean region bordering on the Red Sea.

The "crook within arrows" symbol still appears in the Valley Temple of Sneferu at Dahshur (c. 2520–2470 BCE).

== Classical forms ==
The classical (and later) official character for the god Min was:

R22 R12

The hieroglyph gives the god's name Mnv, and its phonetic value is hm, as in the city of hm (the Greek Letopolis, and today’s Ausim in the Nile Delta).

A further descriptive variation, in which the god is additionally shown in his ithyphallic state, is:

R22 R12 C8

== Early examples ==
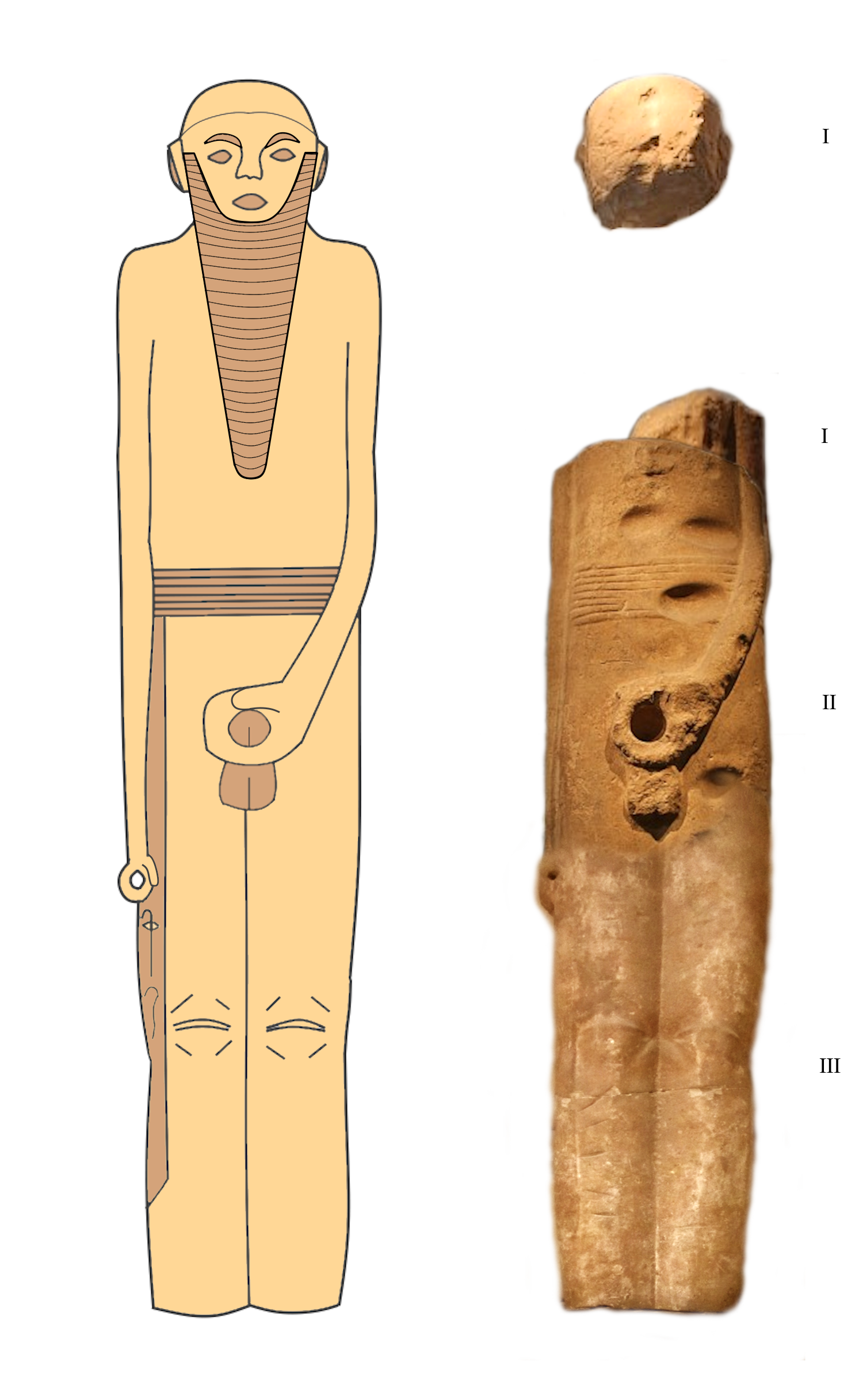
Reconstruction of the Koptos colossi, pre-dynastic colossal statues of the God Min, Koptos, Late Naqada II- Early Naqada III, about 3300 BCE.

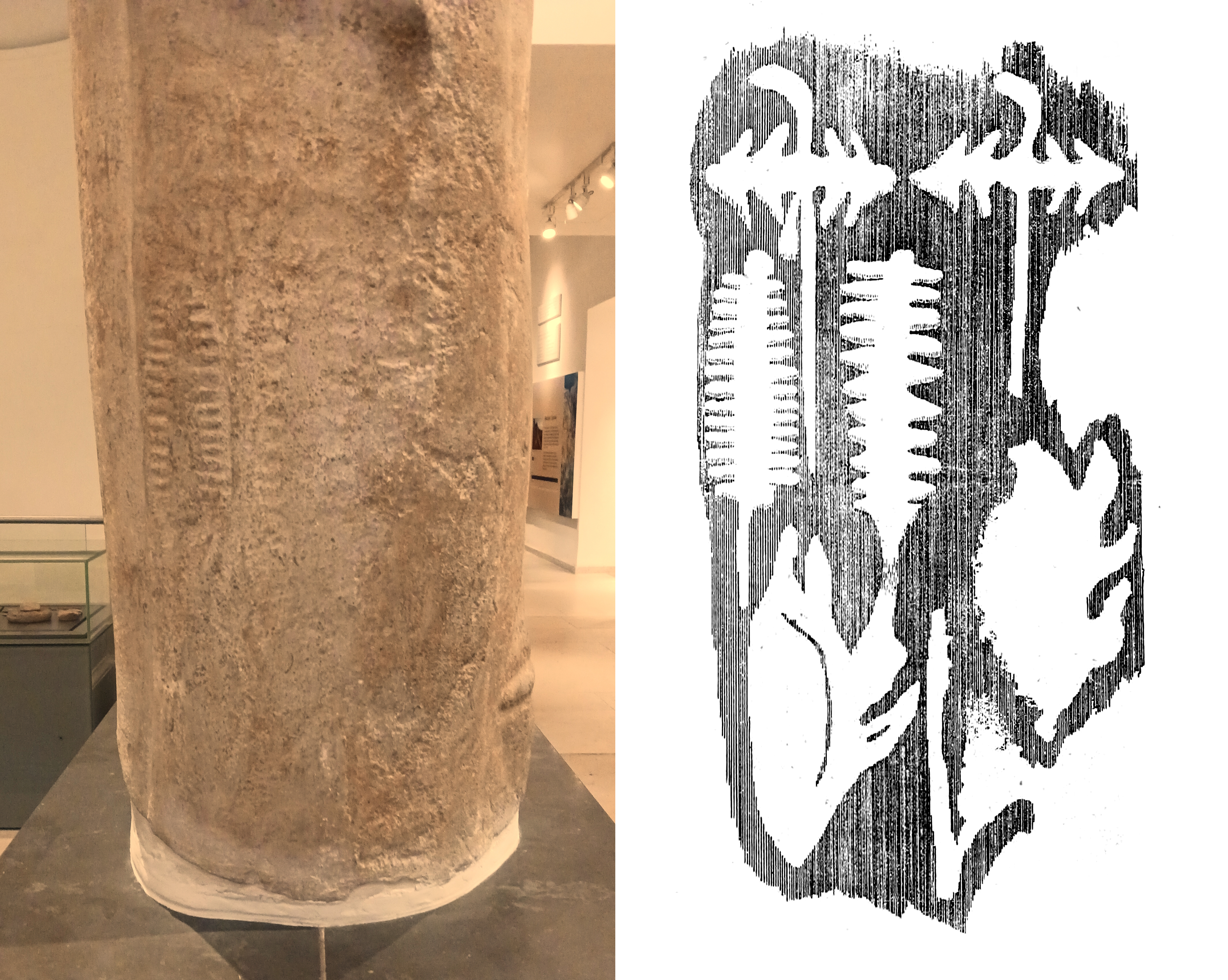
Engravings with the character for Min, with sawfish blades and shells, on one of the Koptos statues.

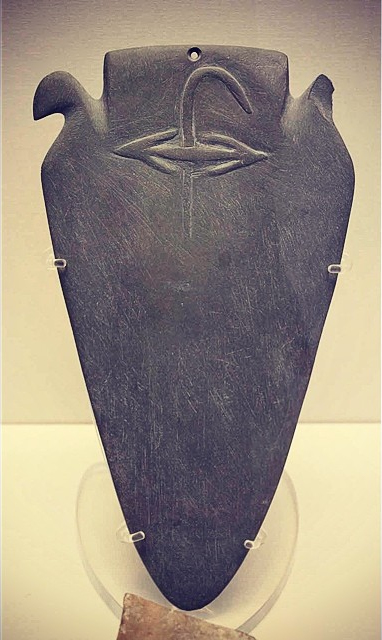
Mudstone Min palette with hieroglyphs in relief. Late Predynastic, Naqada III. 3250-3100 BC. From El-Amra
