= Koptos colossi =

Series of three monumental statues

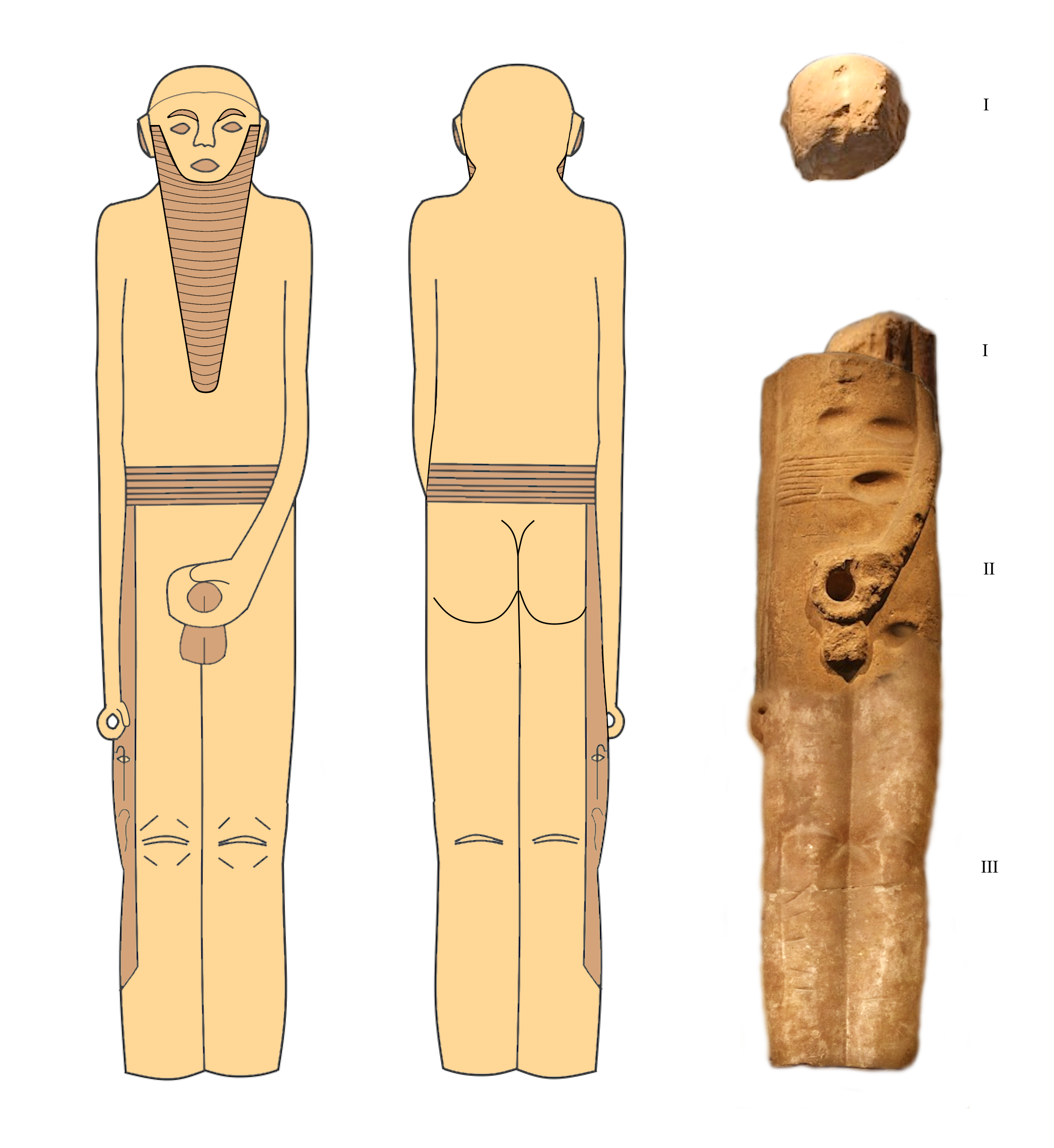
- Reconstruction of Pre-dynastic colossal statues of the God Min, Koptos, Late Naqada II- Early Naqada III, about 3300 BCE.
- Material: Limestone
- Size: 4 meters
- Weight: 2 tons
- Created: c. 3300 BCE
- Discovered: Koptos; 25.995556°N 32.815833°E
- Present location: Ashmolean Museum; Cairo Museum

Location

The Koptos colossi, or Coptos colossi, are a series of three monumental statues, now in the Ashmolean Museum and the Cairo Museum, discovered in an ancient temple of Min at Koptos, Egypt, by Flinders Petrie at the end of the 19th century, in 1894.

== Description ==
The colossi are likely the first known depictions of the Egyptian god of fertility Min.

They are dated to circa 3300 BCE, from the late Naqada II to early Naqada III periods. A connection with Narmer (c.3100 BCE) was suggested by Bruce Williams in 1988, especially in relation to the latest of the three colossi, Colossus III (Cairo).

The estimated size of the three known statues ranges from 372 cm to 403 cm, weighing about 2 tons each. The statues show a bearded man, naked but for a belt and a sash, holding his erect penis. An early form of the character for "Min" is inscribed on the side of two of these statues (AN1894.105e and JE 30770b).

The remains of three similar monumental statues were found in Koptos, two of which are now in the Ashmolean Museum (two bodies and one head), and in the Cairo Museum (a pair of legs).

The statues show a naked man standing. His right arm is held straight along his right flank, his fist being clenched around a lost object, possibly a scepter, or Min's characteristic flail. His left arm is shown holding his erect penis. His legs are held together straight, with the knees roughly marked. The head is bearded, with large protruding ears. He only wears a belt and a narrow sash descending on his left side, on which several inscriptions can be found.

Stylistically, the colossi unambiguously belong to the "Preformal" artistic of the Egyptian Predynastic period. Their style is highly consistent with other known objects from the Pre-Dynastic objects, and their exceptionalism rather lies in monumental size.

According to Kemp (2018), the classic image of god Min was derived from the Koptos colossi. That classic image of Min emerged for the first time during the late Second Dynasty (c. 2700 BCE), adopting various elements from the Koptos colossi, but refining them and adapting them to their current styles.

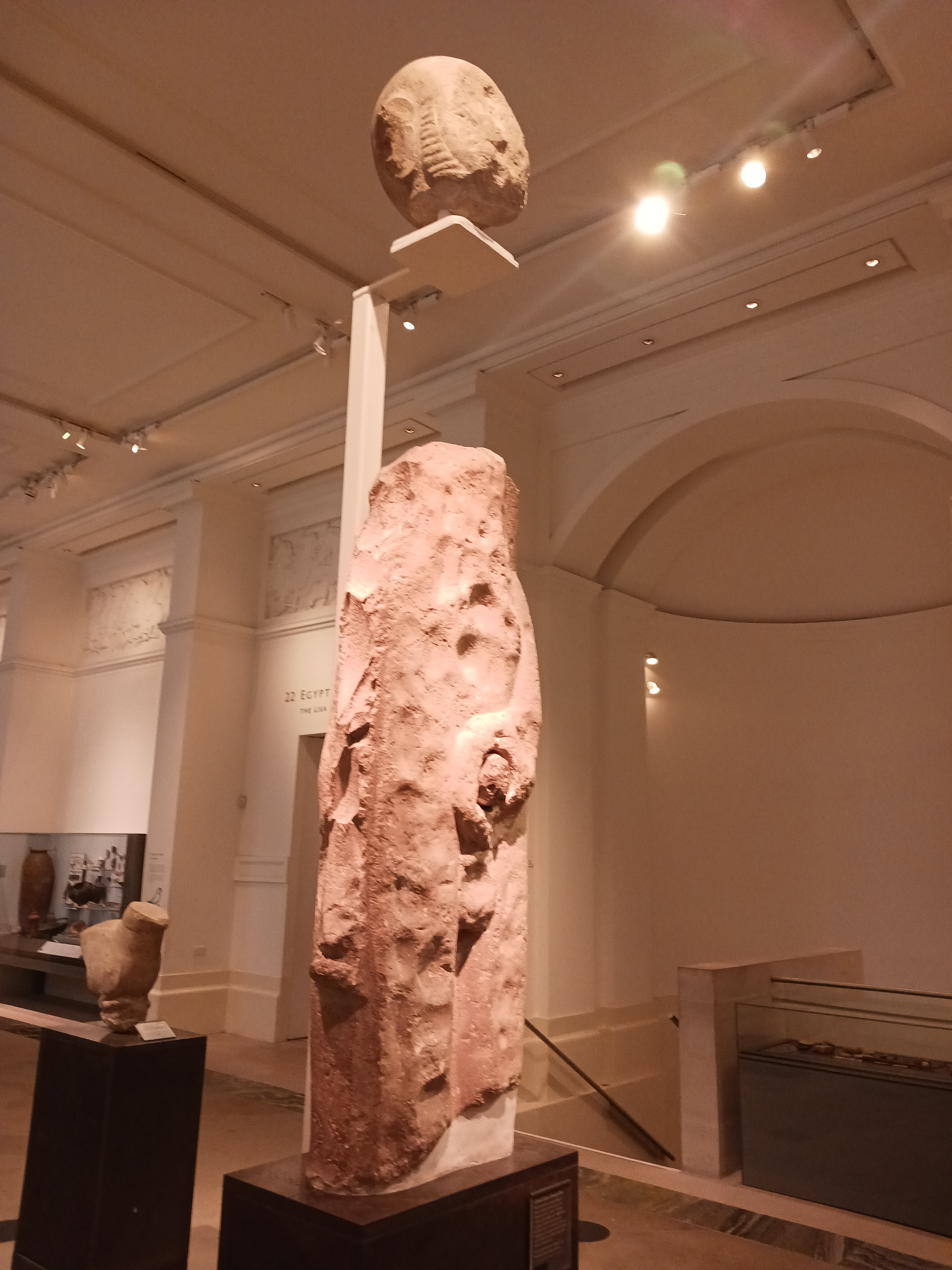
Body of Koptos colossus I (with head) (Ashmolean Museum, AN1894.105d)

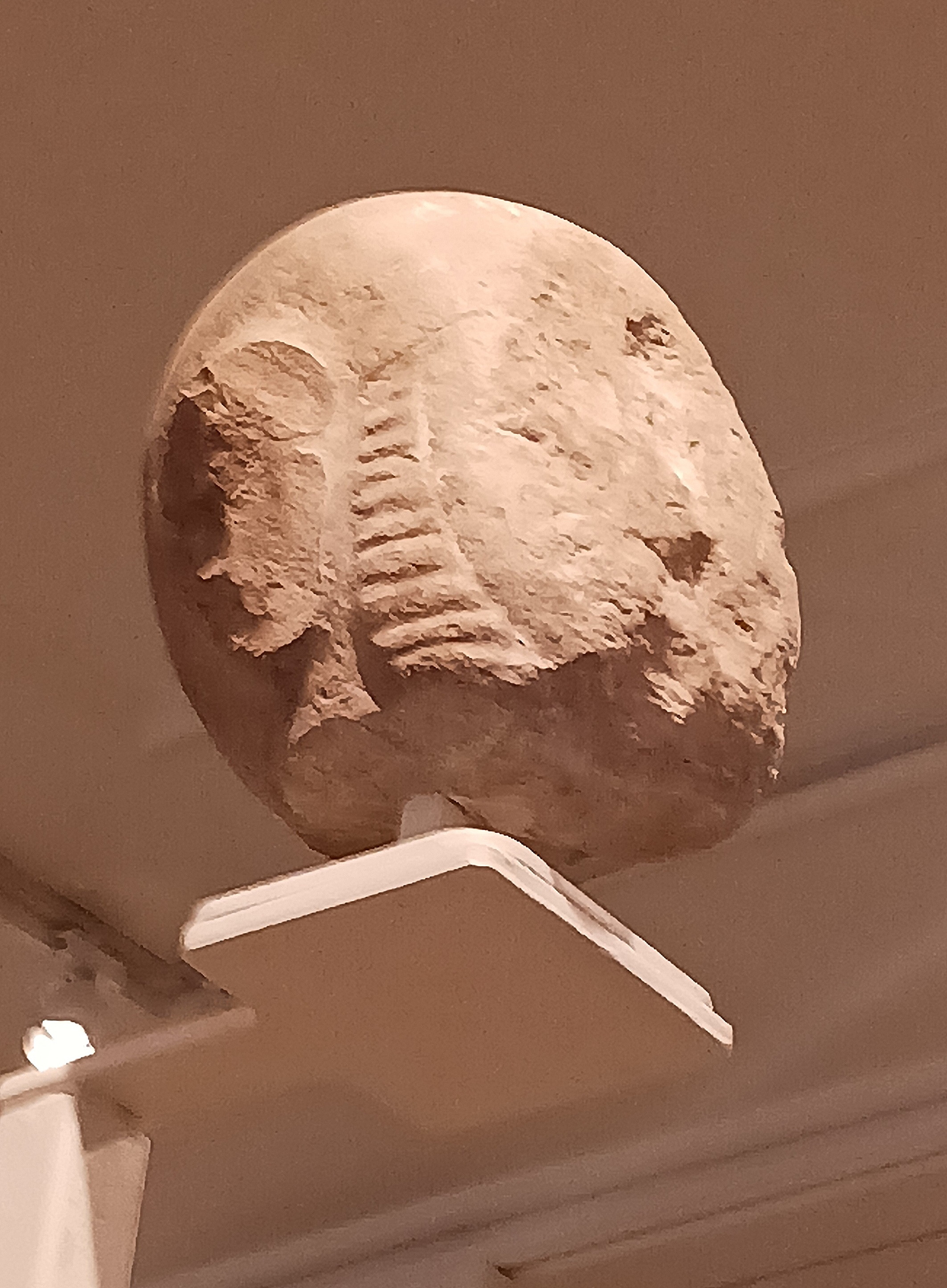
Head of Koptos colossus I, with visible ear and beard

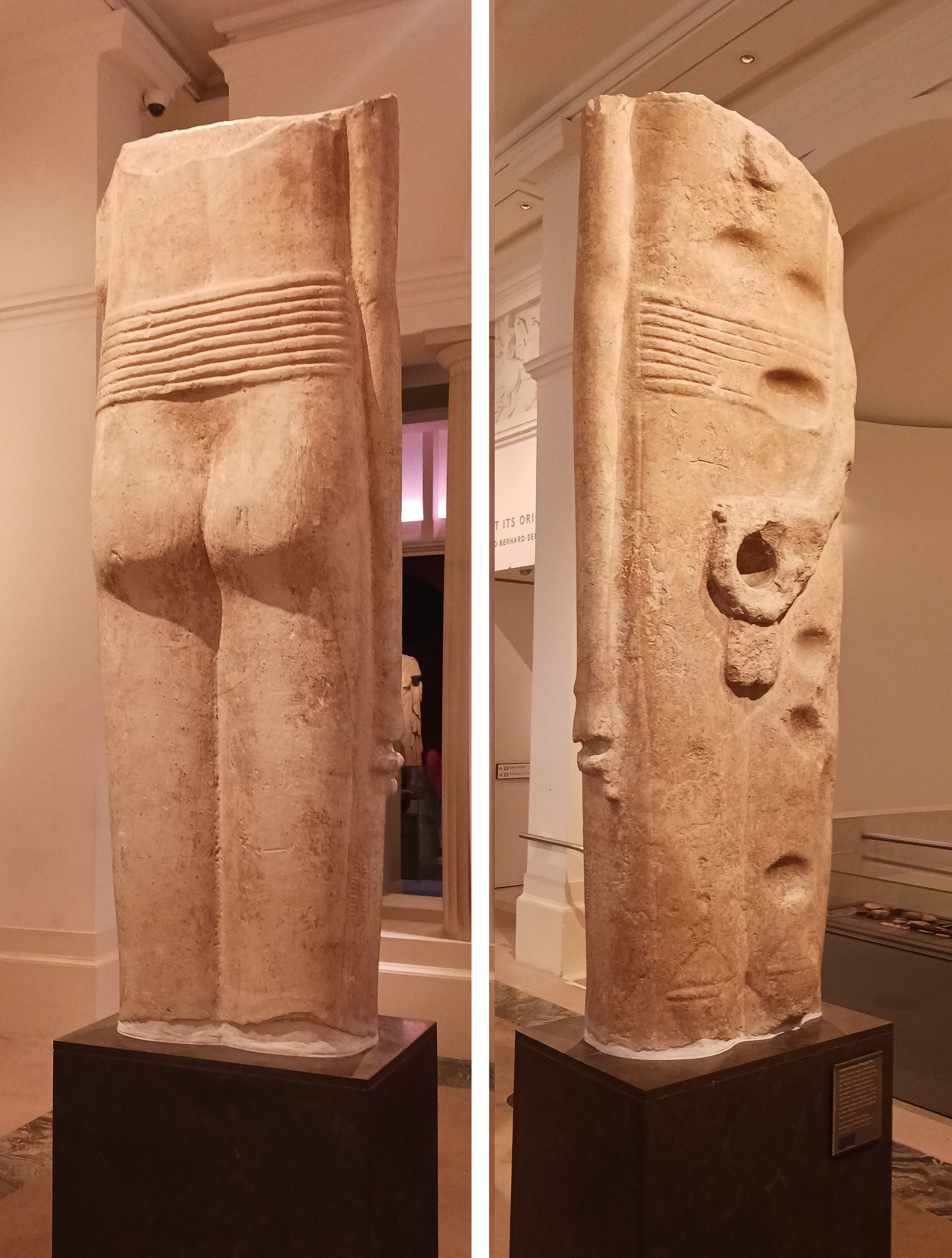
Body of Koptos colossus II, back and front (Ashmolean Museum, AN1894.105e)

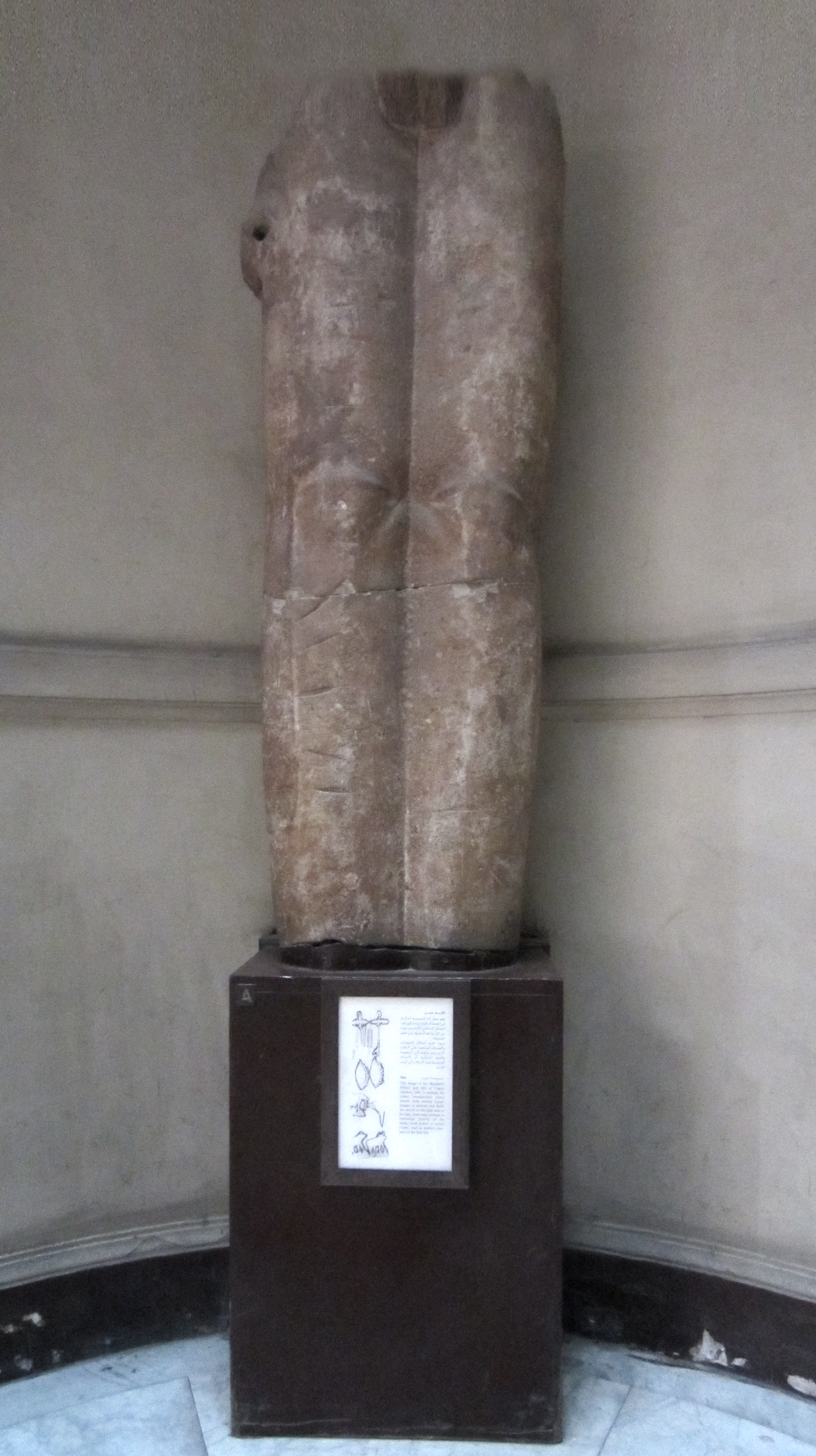
Legs of Koptos colossus III (Cairo Museum, JE 30770b)

== Inscriptions ==
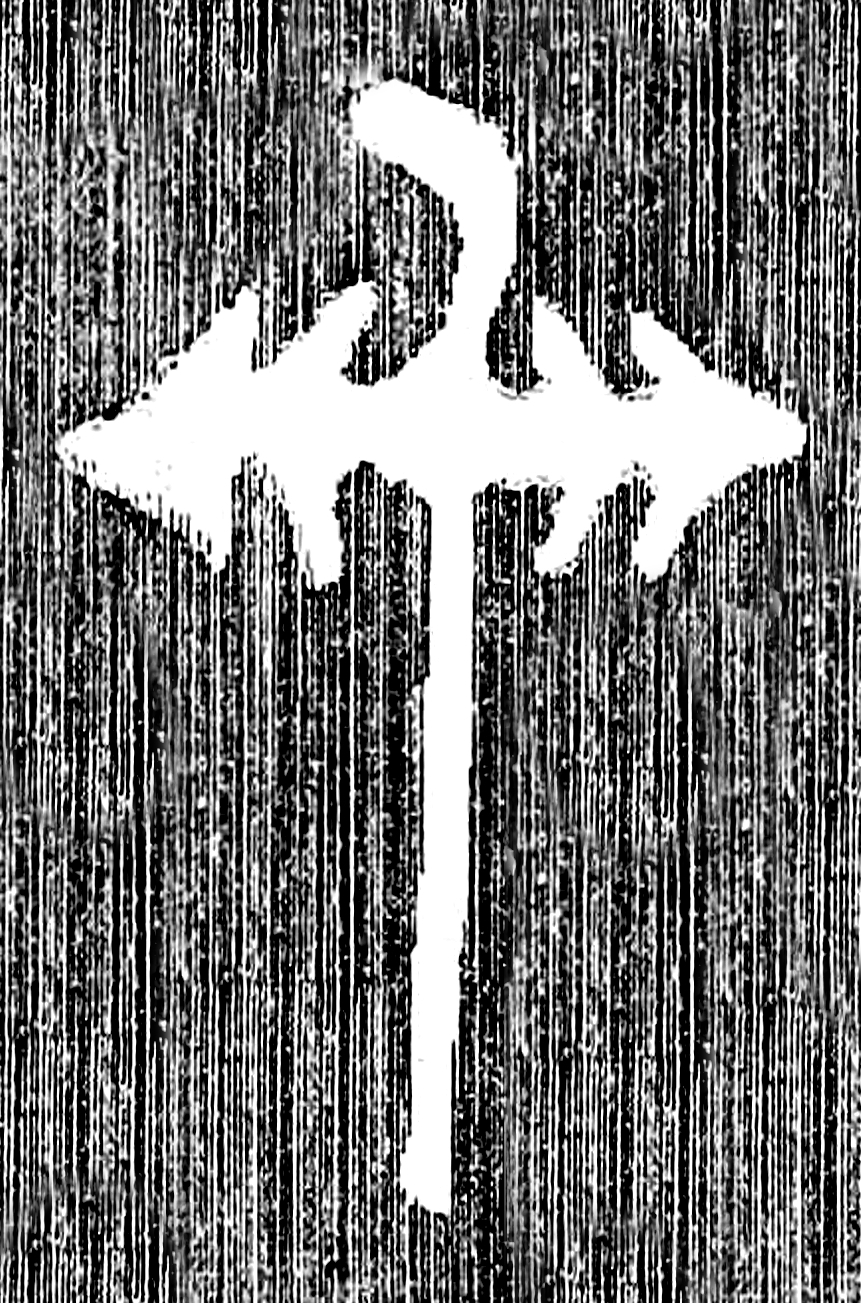
Min symbol on the Koptos colossi.

On the Koptos monumental statues of Min, generally dated to circa 3300 BCE during the late Naqada II- early Naqada III periods, the Min symbol is inscribed, together with marine objects: the "sword" of a sawfish and two shells of the Pterocera species of conchs. These symbols seem to corroborate the traditional origin histories of the god, according to which he originated in the fabulous "Land of Punt", in the Eritrean region bordering on the Red Sea.

The inscriptions are:

- Colossus I (Ashmolean): a horned mammal head. Below, two seven-fingered conches.
- Colossus II (Ashmolean): two Min symbols. Below, two saw shapes. At the bottom, two conches, between them a pole and a couchant lion.
- Colossus III (Cairo): two Min symbols, with two rectangular shapes in between. Below, two seven-fingered conches. At the bottom, four motifs: a tail, a triangular shape, an elephant, a bull and a lion, all treading on triangles.

The presence of the Min symbol in two of these monumental statues is essential in their identification with early forms of the god Min.

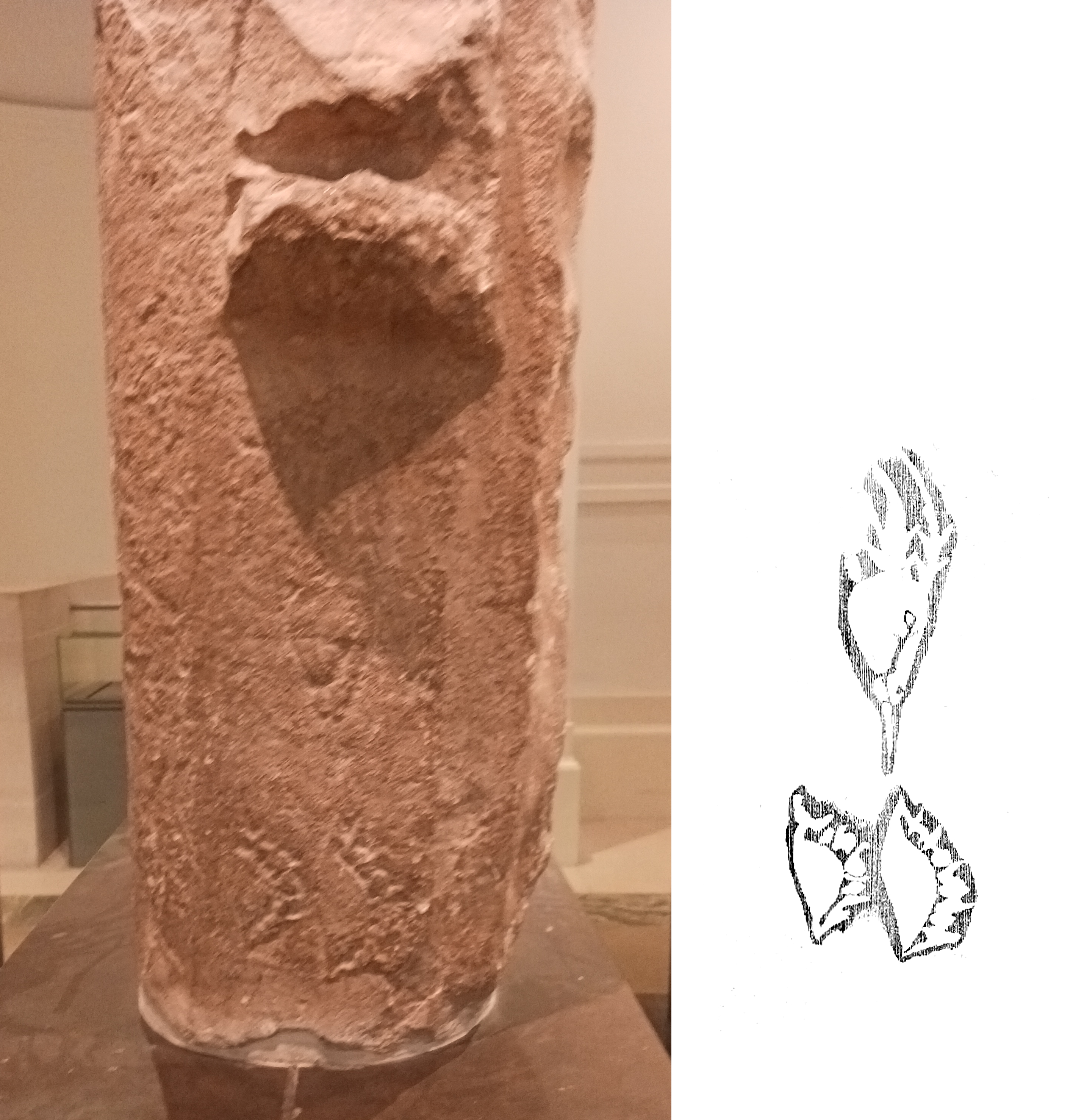
Inscriptions on Ashmolean Museum, AN1894.105d

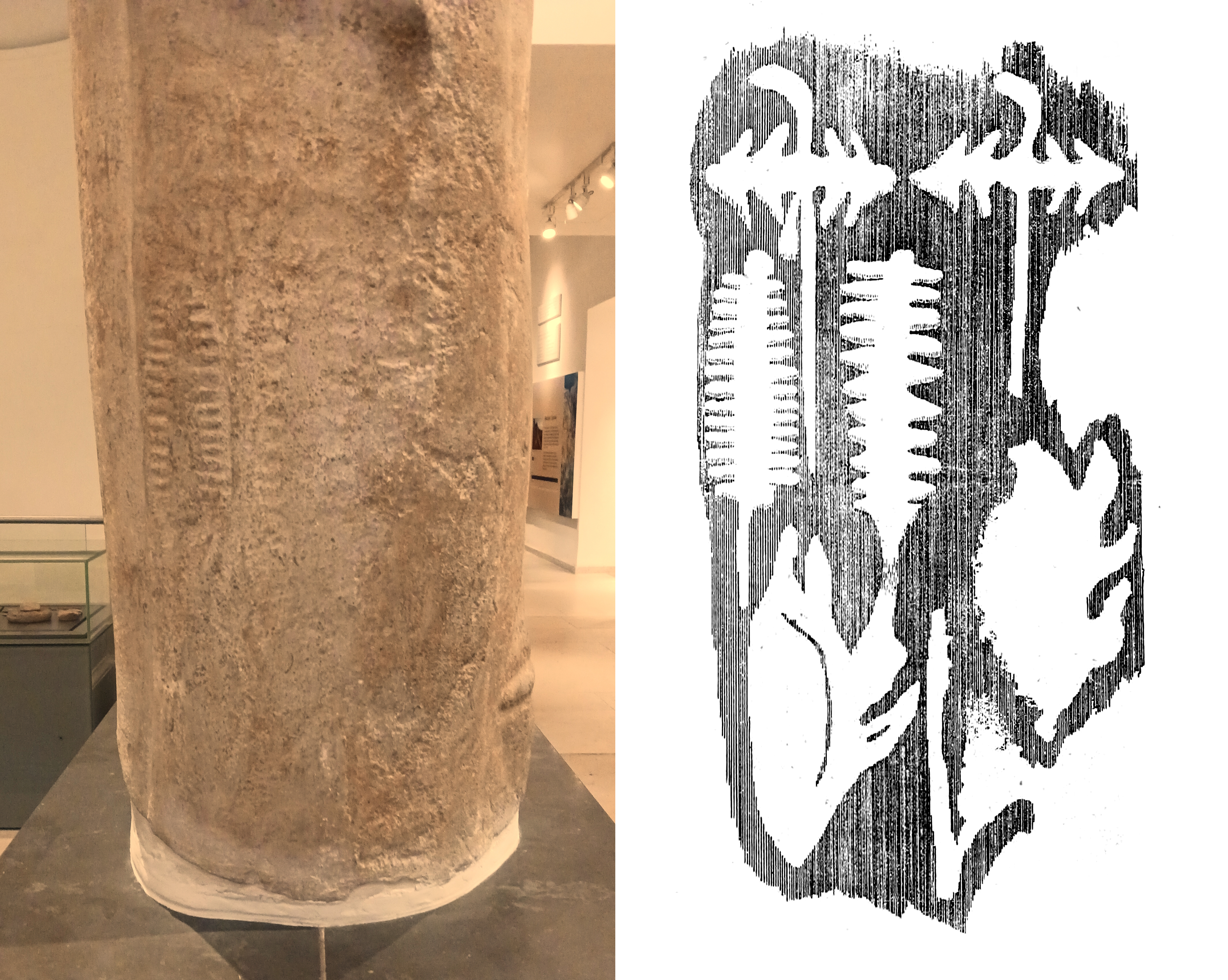
Engravings with the character for Min, with swordfish blades and sea shells, on Ashmolean Museum, AN1894.105e

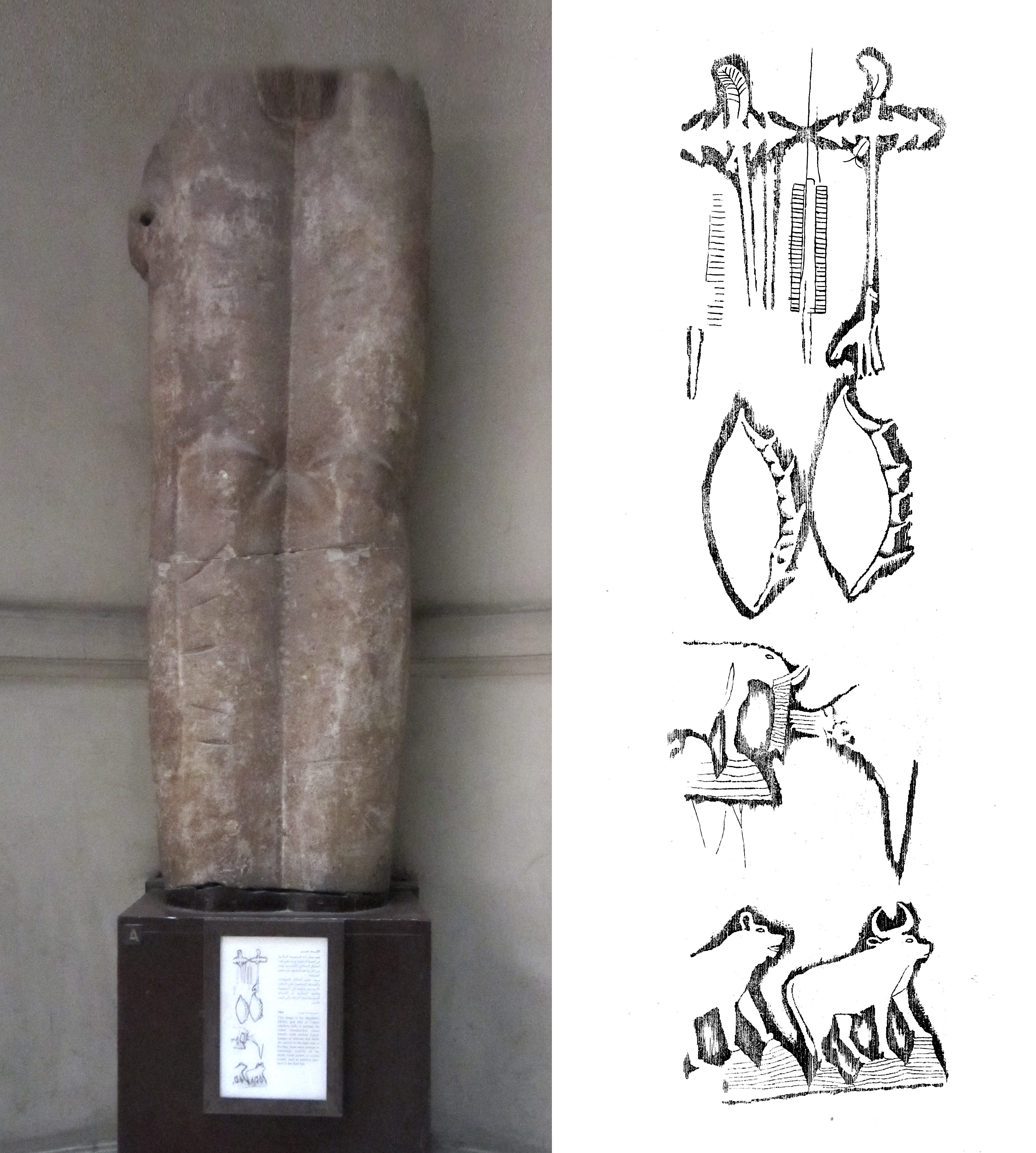
Inscription of the Cairo colossus

== Min Temple in Koptos ==
The Temple in Koptos was known as a Ptolemaic temple. Excavations made in the 19th century showed that a much earlier structure existed, with various monumental objects from the Pre-Dynastic period, circa 3300 BCE. The original structure necessary to house the colossi may have been made of mud bricks and wood, and would not have left significant ruins in modern times. Its structure may have been similar to that of a Temple appearing on the Narmer Macehead: a low structure with a curved roof and corner projections, with a large walled courtyard in front.

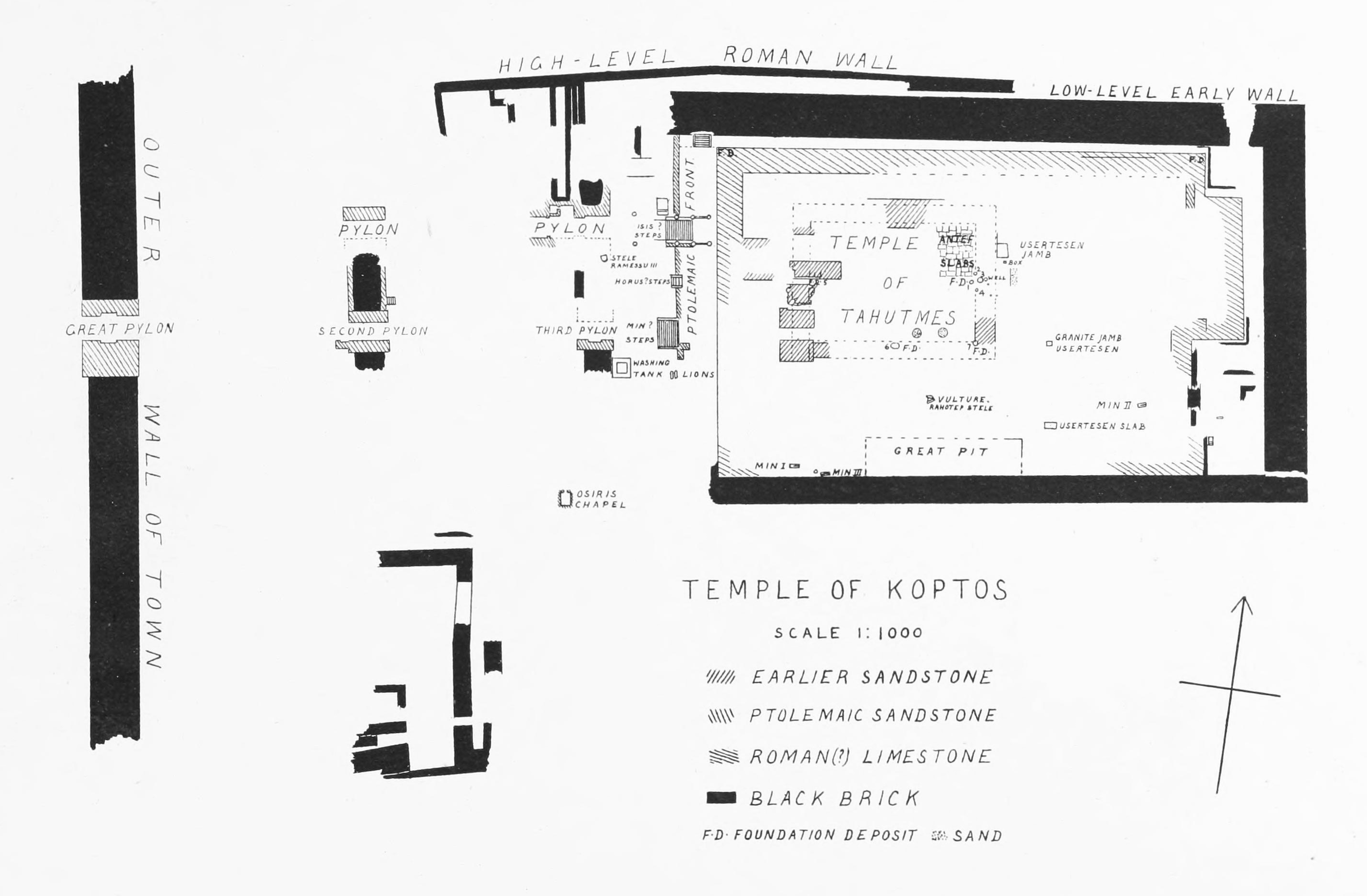
Plan of the Temple of Min in Koptos, where three monumental statues of Min were discovered, dated to circa 3300 BCE

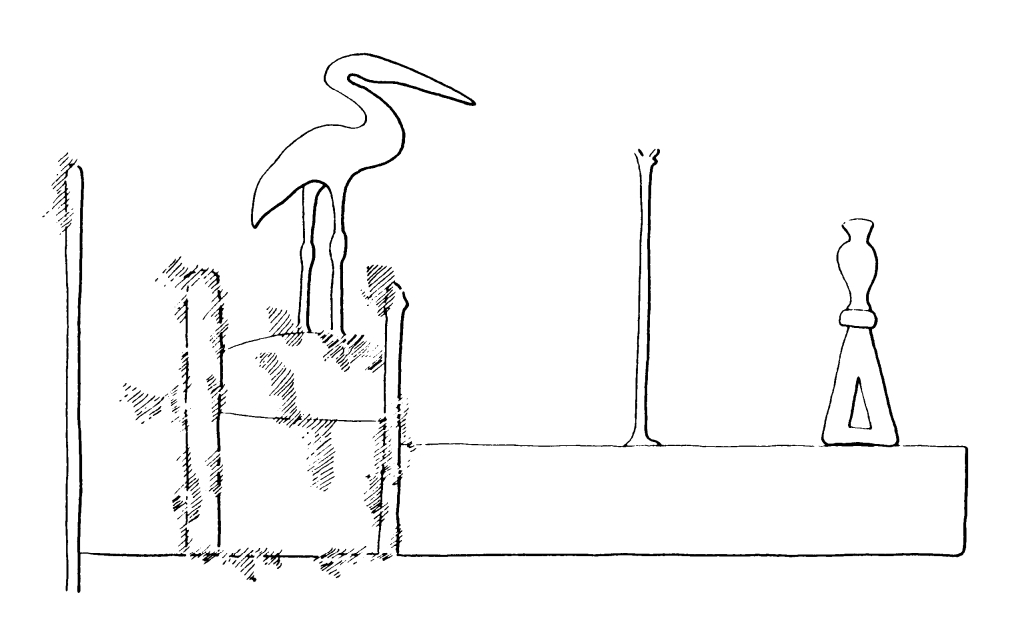
Contemporary Temple on the Narmer macehead: a low structure with a curved roof and corner projections, with a large walled courtyard.

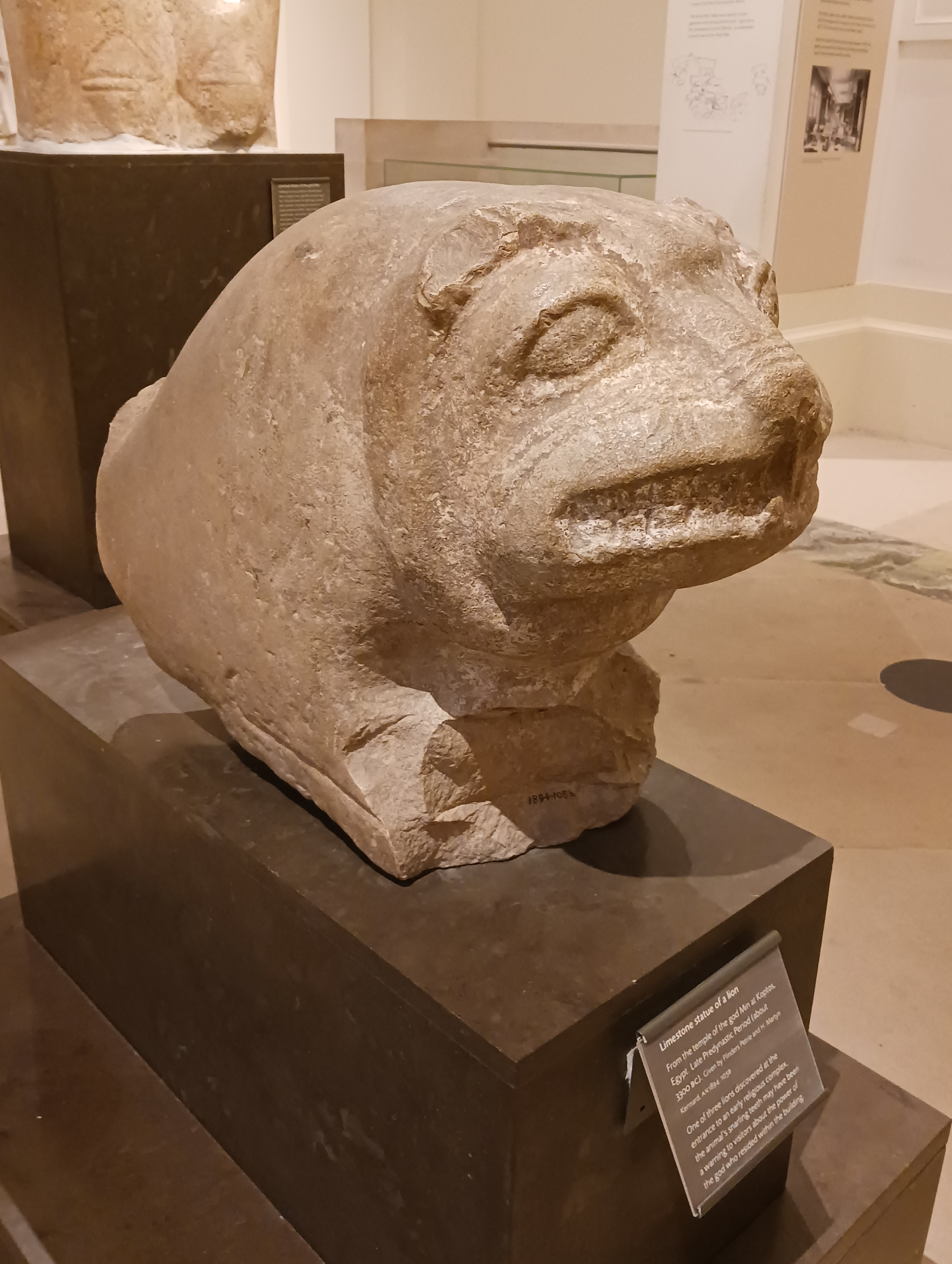
Guardian lion at the entrance of the Min Temple of Koptos, circa 3300 BCE (Ashmolean Museum, AN1894.105b)

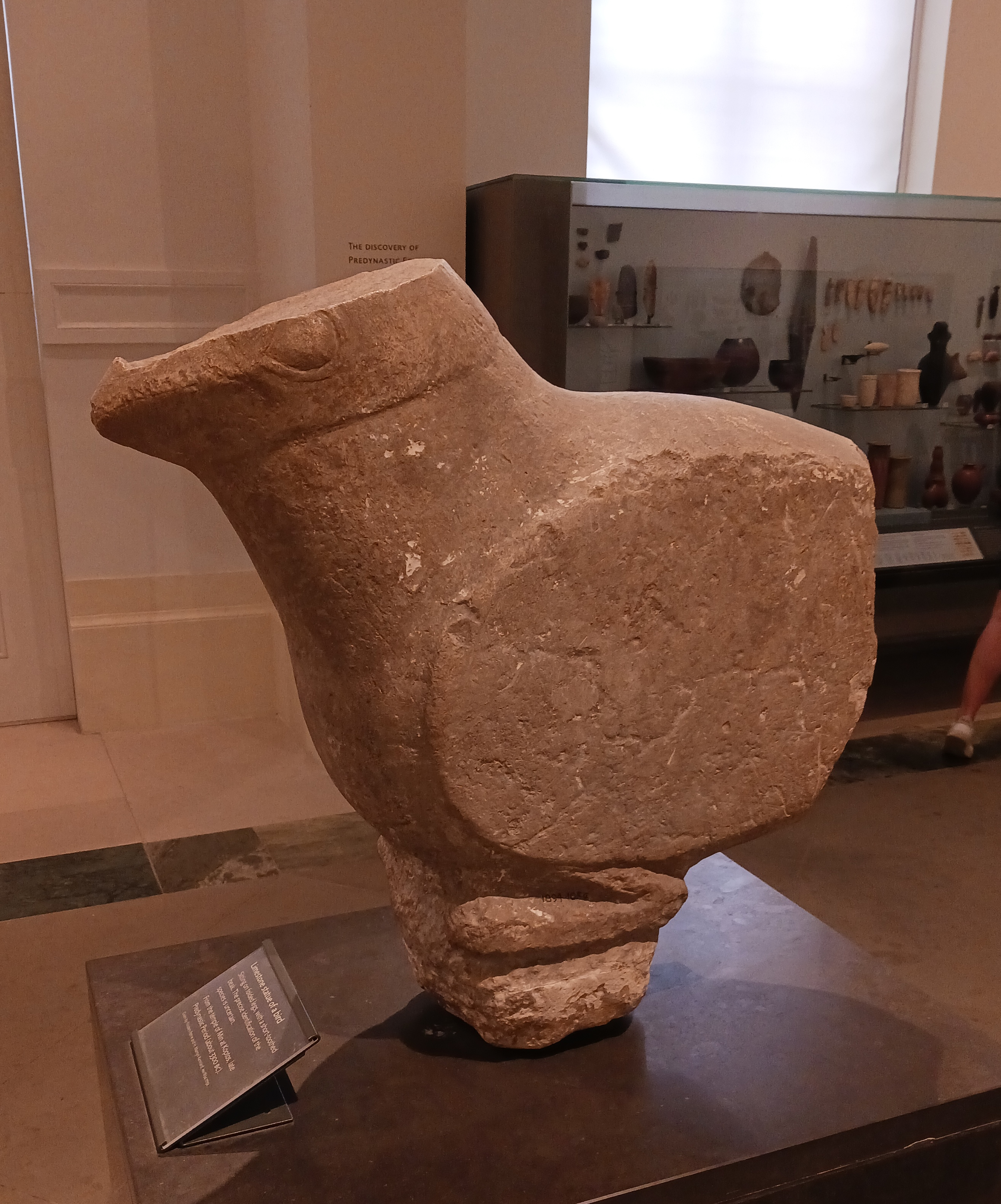
Falcon, Min Temple of Koptos, circa 3300 BCE (Ashmolean Museum AN1894.105a)

== Mesopotamian parallels ==
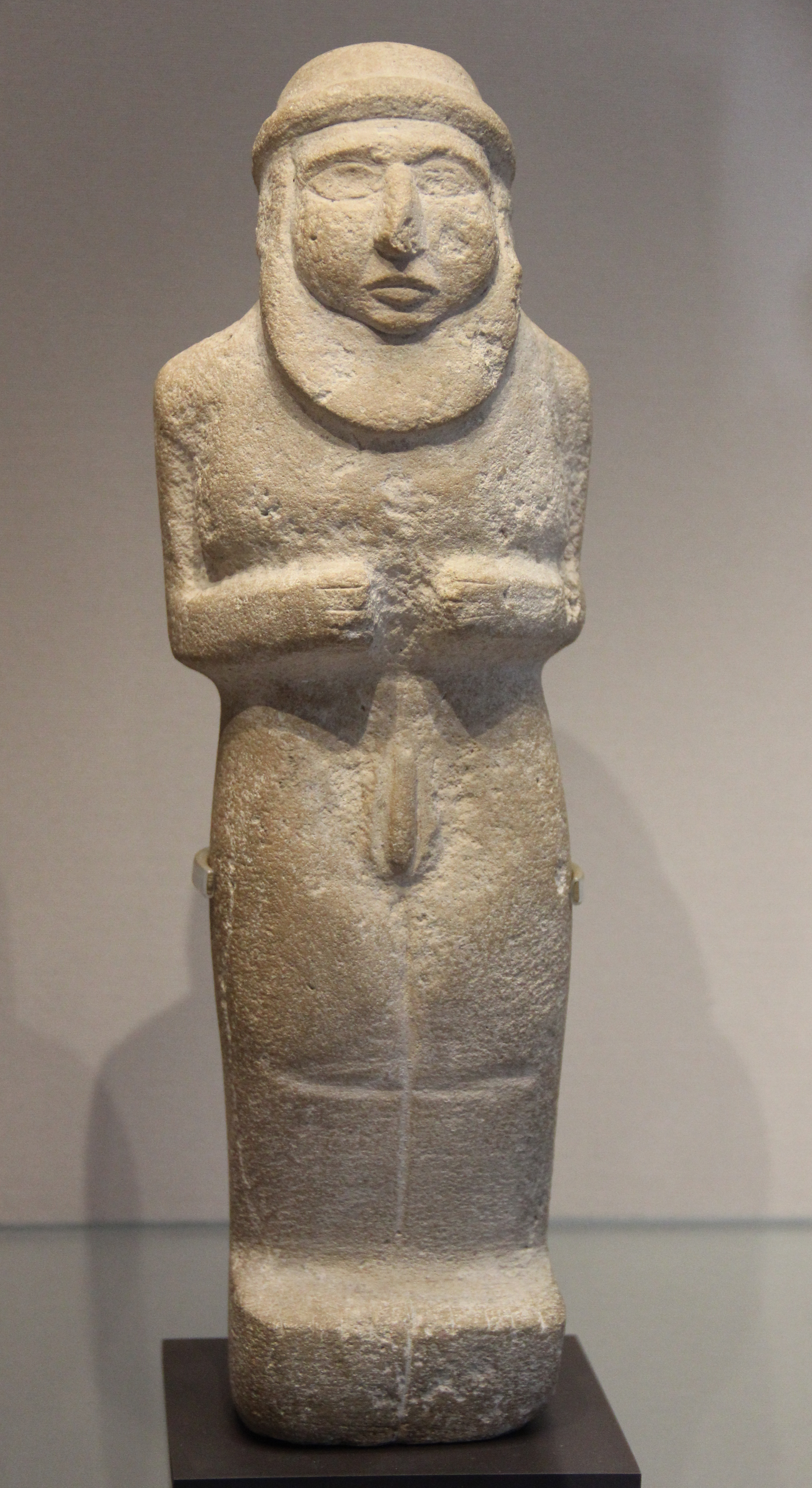
Sculpture of the ritually nude 'Priest-King', Late Uruk period, c.3300 BCE, Louvre Museum

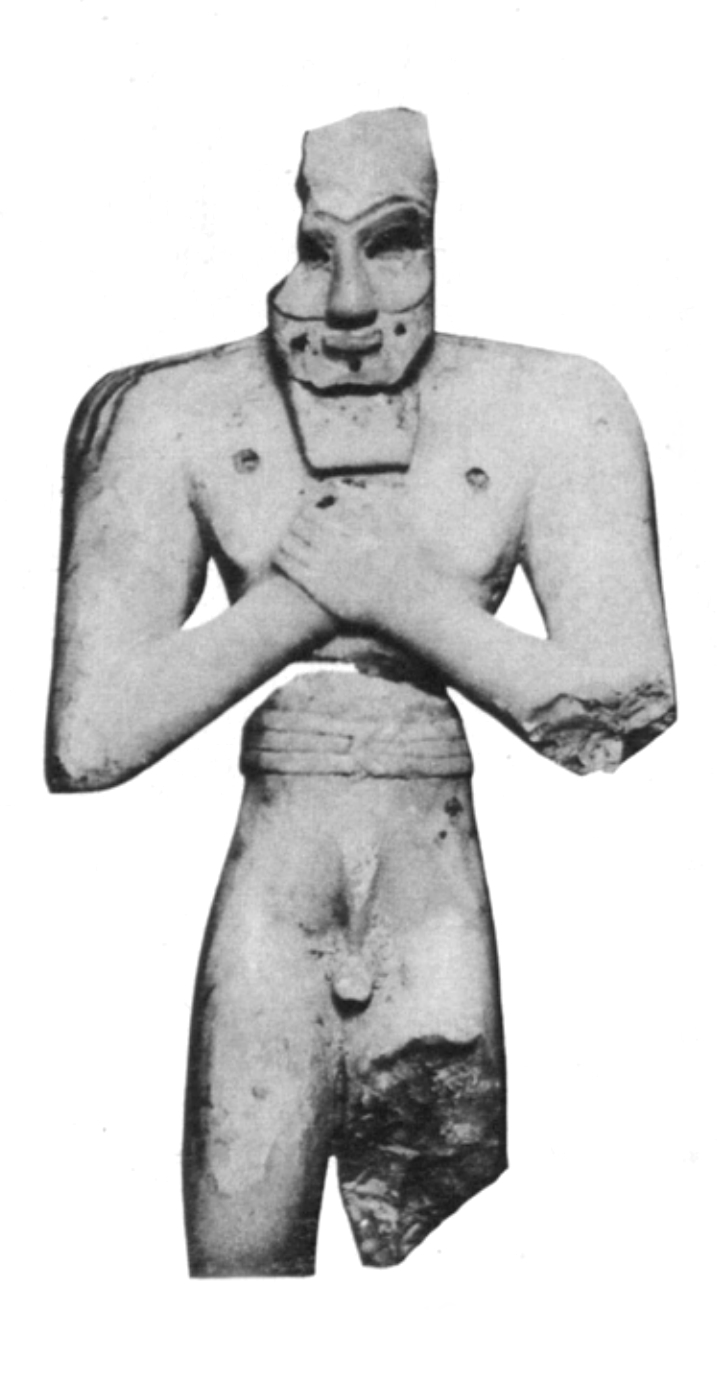
Mesopotamian ithyphallic statue. Early Dynastic temple in Umma. Baghdad Museum

Some older authors have regularly pointed to parallels between the Koptos colossi and Early Dynastic Mesopotamian statues that also sometimes show naked ithyphallic statues with a girdle round the waist. These Mesopotamian depictions are apparently related to the bull-men fighting lions and other wild animals as there appear on countless seals.

The discoverer, Petrie, understood that the style of the colossi was very unusual in the context of traditional Egyptian statuary, and assigned them to "Eastern Invaders" whom he considered to have founded dynastic Egypt.

=== Cultural and commercial exchanges ===
With "Naqada" (Nubt, the "City of Gold"), the neighbouring city of Koptos benefited from the exceptional wealth of the eastern desert region in gold, and their strategic position for the commerce of precious metals. The exploitation of precious metals from the Eastern Desert, and the development of floodplain agriculture creating surpluses which could generate demand for a variety of crafts, made the region especially advanced in term of economic specialization and diversification, much more advanced than the regions of contemporary Lower Egypt. Imports from Mesopotamia appear to have been quite intensive during the late Gerzean period (late Naqada II), and correspond to the Protoliterate b and c cultures of Mesopotamia (Uruk period). Naqada was at the center of the developing trade of gold from the eastern desert of Egypt. This may have stimulated the direct involvement of Mesopotamian traders, who, accompanied by artists and various skilled personnel, may have introduced Mesopotamian styles and practices. The exploitation of gold may also have stimulated the development of the first organized proto-state structures in Egypt.

=== Northern Mesopotamia Pre-Pottery Neolithic ===
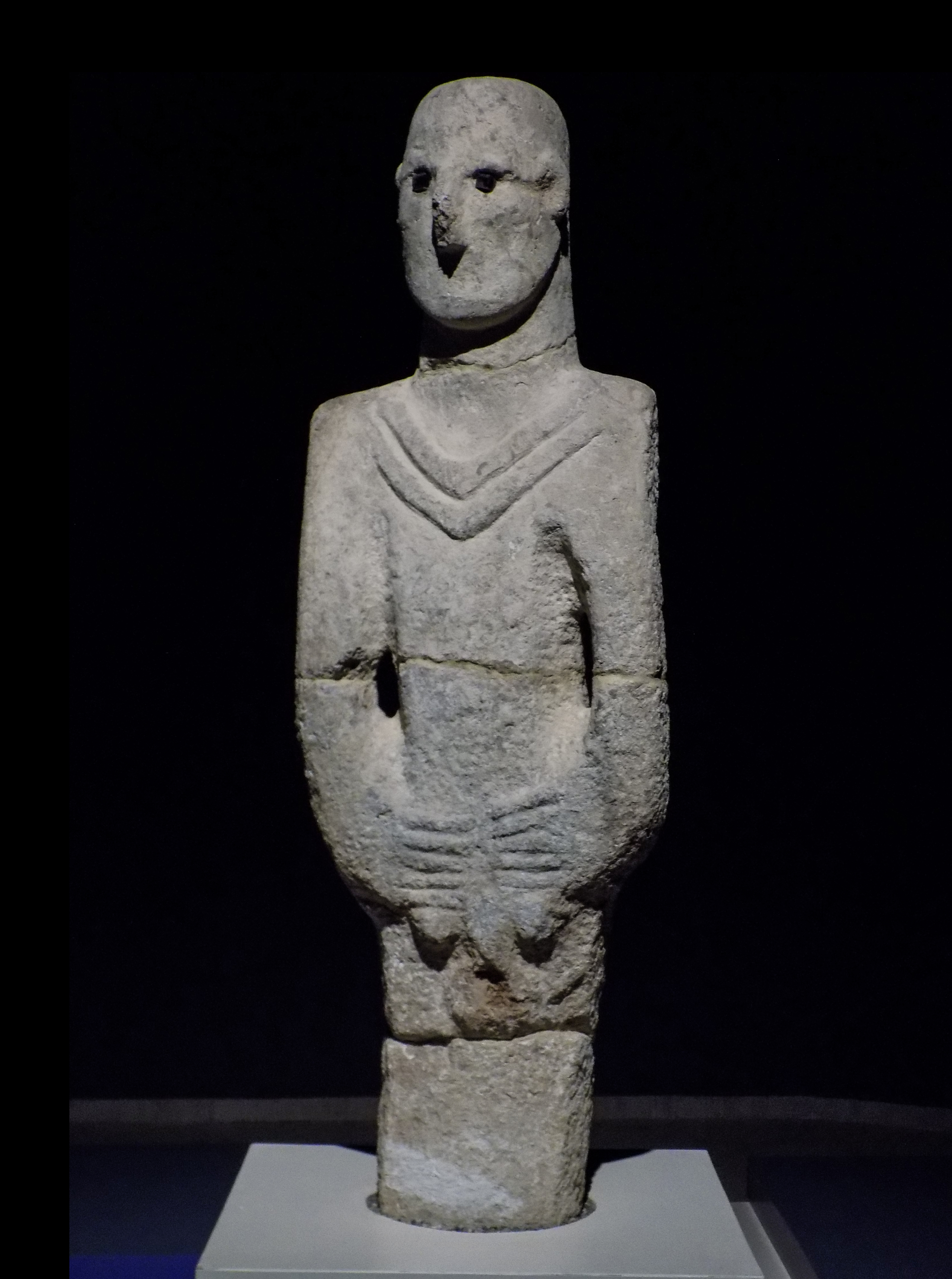
Urfa Man, northern Mesopotamia, circa 9000 BCE

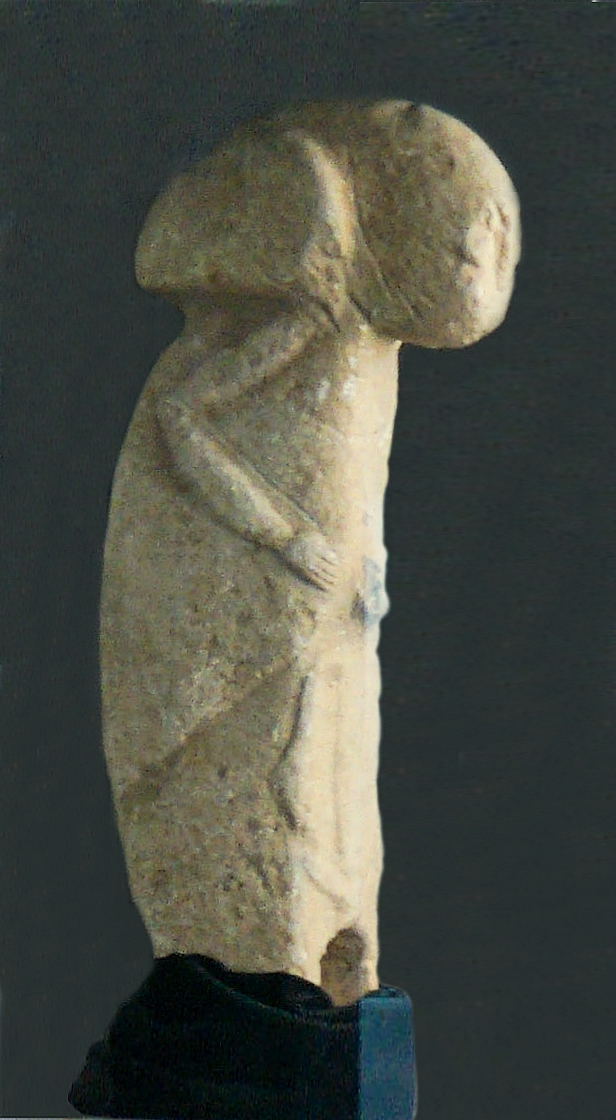
Kilisik sculpture, circa 7500-7000 BCE

The Koptos colossi are also "remarkably similar" to the much earlier Pre-Pottery Neolithic A statues of northern Mesopotamia, dating to circa 9,000 BCE, such as the Urfa Man (a sculpture from a Pre-Pottery Neolithic temple at Yeni Mahalle), or the Adiyaman-Kilisik sculpture. They share the same hieratic construction and phallic emphasis. According to Ian Hodder, the cult of the Egyptian god Min is related to the Middle East and goes back millennia.

== See also ==
- Ancient Egyptian religion

== Sources ==
- Ashmolean Museum (2025). "Ashmolean Museum, exhibit notice".
- Baqué-Manzano, Lucas (2002). "Further arguments on the Coptos colossi". Bulletin de l'Institut français d'archéologie orientale (102).
- Baqué-Manzano, Lucas (1 January 2004). Los colosos del dios Min en el templo de Coptos. Etiología conceptual de una gran figura divina (iconografía, iconología y mitología). Barcelona: Thesis Aegyptiaca II, Librería Mizar.
- Betrò, Maria C. (1996). Hieroglyphics : the writings of ancient Egypt.
- Kemp, Barry; Boyce, Andrew; Harrell, James (October 2000). "The Colossi from the Early Shrine at Coptos in Egypt". Cambridge Archaeological Journal. 10 (2): 211–242. doi:10.1017/S0959774300000081.
- Kemp, Barry John (2018). Ancient Egypt: anatomy of a civilization (3rd ed.). New-York (NY): Routledge. ISBN 9780415827256.
- Olette-Pelletier, Jean-Guillaume (1 January 2021). "Min and the other Egyptian gods". Akhmîm. Egypt's Forgotten City. Staatliche Museen zu Berlin.
- Williams, Bruce (1988). "Narmer and the Coptos Colossi". Journal of the American Research Center in Egypt. 25. doi:10.2307/40000869.
