= The Pharaoh Who Conquered the Sea =

- Directed by: Stephane Begoin
- Presented by: Cheryl Ward
- Country of origin: United Kingdom

Original release
- Network: BBC Four
- Release: 6 January 2010

The Pharaoh Who Conquered the Sea is a 2010 British documentary film produced by the BBC. The film premiered on BBC Four on 6 January 2010, and is presented by archaeologist Cheryl Ward. The duration of the film is fifty nine minutes.

== Overview ==
The film explores the legend that a large number of ships were built by Hatshepsut, the fifth pharaoh of the Eighteenth Dynasty of Egypt, capable of trade with the Land of Punt. Hatshepsut is known as one of the earliest female rulers of Egypt, her reign lasting around twenty years. The ships are illustrated in the bas-relief located at the temple in Luxor, and were alleged to have sailed the Red Sea. There is an academic dispute over the ships, and some archaeologists have criticised the notion that the ships were actually built, calling the ships a myth. To test the legend, the documentary's archaeologists performed an experiment by reconstructing a working ship, named Min, using the bas-relief and knowledge of the technology of the era as a guide. The ship was able to sail, and according to the film, demonstrated that the ancient Egyptians could have accomplished the feat.

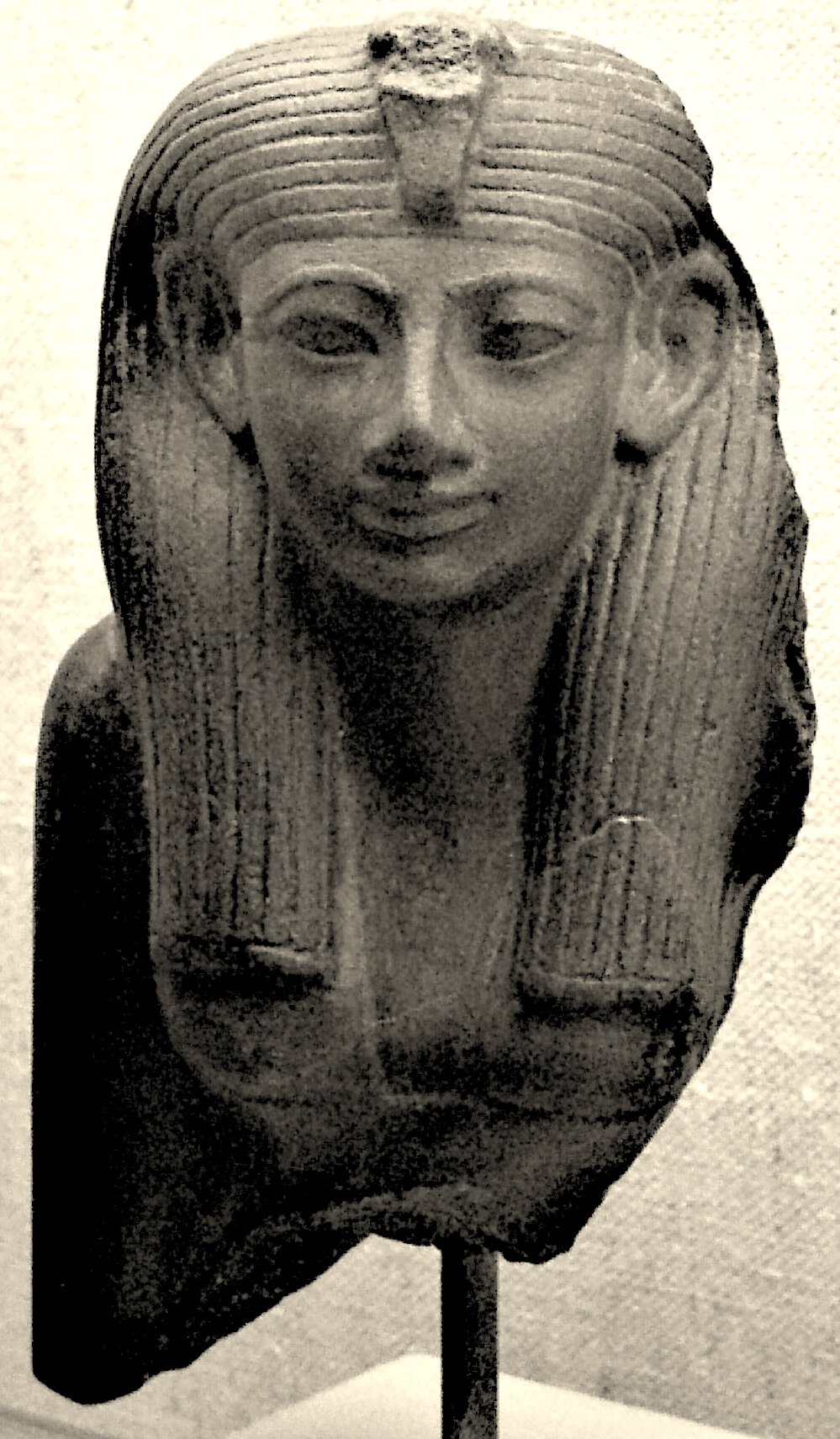
Fragmentary statue of Hatshepsut, quartz diorite, c. 1498–1483 BC Museum of Fine Arts, Boston

== Reception ==
David Stubbs of The Guardian described the film as "part insight into the enigma of a very early feminist icon, part watching people build a giant model kit." Paul Whitelaw of The Scotsman praised the film for depicting a "convincing case to support the hypothesis that, contrary to popular belief, the ancient Egyptians possessed the technological wherewithal to sail the high seas," but sardonically remarked that the narrator "sounded like Miriam Margolyes as the sexy rabbit from the Cadbury's Caramel adverts," a choice that was "tenuously apt" because of the "soft-focus dramatic reconstructions, Hatshepsut feeding grapes to her royal monkey etc" that "resembled a Flake ad."
