= Min of the Desert =

Replica of an ancient Egyptian ship

- exhibited at the National Museum of Suez in 2010

History

Egypt
- Name: Min of the Desert
- Namesake: Min
- Laid down: 2008
- Launched: 2008
- Completed: 2008
- Maiden voyage: 2008
- Home port: Rosetta
- Status: Exhibit in dry dock

General characteristics
- Type: cog
- Displacement: 29.974 tonne
- Length: 20.3 m (66 ft 7 in)
- Beam: 4.9 m (16 ft 1 in)
- Draught: 1.183 m (3 ft 10.6 in)
- Sail plan: Single square rig sail of 80.9 m^{2} (871 sq ft)
- Speed: 7 knots (13 km/h)
- Crew: 20

Min of the Desert is a modern working copy of an ancient Egyptian ship of Hatshepsut's time, built for the BBC documentary The Pharaoh Who Conquered the Sea. It was named after the Egyptian fertility god Min.
