= Nim (name) =

Nim is a given name and surname. Notable people with the name include:

== Given name ==
- Nim Campbell (1929—2012), Scottish rugby player
- Nim Vind (fl. from 2005), born Chris Kirkham, Canadian musician and songwriter

== Surname ==
- Devender Kumar Nim (fl. from 2017), Indian politician
- Hu Nim (1930/1932–1977), also known by the alias Phoas, Cambodian politician
