= Nym =

NYM or Nym may refer to:

== Fictional characters ==
- Corporal Nym, in several Shakespeare plays
- Nymeria Sand or "Lady Nym", in the A Song of Ice and Fire novels and the Game of Thrones TV series
- Nym, an alien pirate in Star Wars video games; see List of Star Wars species (F–J) § Feeorin
- Nym, in the role-playing video game Black Sigil: Blade of the Exiled

== NYM ==
- Nigerian Youth Movement
- Northern Yearly Meeting, of US Quakers
- NYM token, a cryptocurrency token by Nym Technologies

== Other uses ==
- New York Mets, a Major League Baseball team that uses this abbreviation for box scores and television scoring displays
- -nym, a suffix for many English nouns pertaining to names and naming
- Nym Crinkle (1835–1903), US newspaper writer
- Karl Marx's nickname for his housekeeper Helene
- Nadym Airport (IATA code: NYM), Russia
- The Nym mixnet, a free and open-source software designed to ensure a high level of privacy in all online communications
- Nym Technologies, a Swiss company proving VPN and blockchain-related software and network services

== See also ==
- Myn (disambiguation)
