= NIMH =

NIMH may refer to:

- Nickel–metal hydride battery (NiMH)
- National Institute of Mental Health, US government agency
- National Institute of Medical Herbalists, UK
- Rats of NIMH, children's book series
- The Secret of NIMH, a 1982 animated film
- The Secret of NIMH 2: Timmy to the Rescue, a 1998 animated film
