= Min (god) =

Ancient Egyptian deity

- The dark-skinned fertility god Min-Amun, with an erect penis and a "flail"
Name in hieroglyphs
R22 R12 C8
- Major cult center: Qift, Akhmim
- Symbol: the lettuce, the phallus, the bull, the belemnite
- Parents: Isis
- Consort: Iabet; Repyt; Isis
- Offspring: Kolanthes

Equivalents
- Greek: Pan, Priapus

Min (Ancient Egyptian: mnw) is an ancient Egyptian god whose cult originated in the predynastic period (4th millennium BCE). He was represented in many different forms, but was most often represented in male human form, shown with an erect penis which he holds in his left hand and an upheld right arm holding a flail.

== Myths and function ==
=== Pre-dynastic period (circa 3300 BCE) ===
Min's cult began and was centered around Coptos (Koptos, modern day Qift) and Akhmim (Panopolis) of Upper Egypt, where in his honour great festivals were held celebrating his "coming forth" with a public procession and presentation of offerings. His other associations include the eastern desert and links to the god Horus. Flinders Petrie excavated two large statues of Min at Qift which are now in the Ashmolean Museum and it is thought by some that they are pre-dynastic. Although not mentioned by name, a reference to "he whose arm is raised in the East" in the Pyramid Texts is thought to refer to Min.

On the Koptos monumental statues of Min, generally dated to circa 3300 BCE during the late Naqada II- early Naqada III periods, the Min symbol is inscribed, together with marine objects: the "sword" of a sawfish and two shells of the Pterocera species. These symbols seem to corroborate the traditional origin histories of the god, according to which he originated in the fabulous "Land of Punt", in the Eritrean region bordering on the Red Sea.

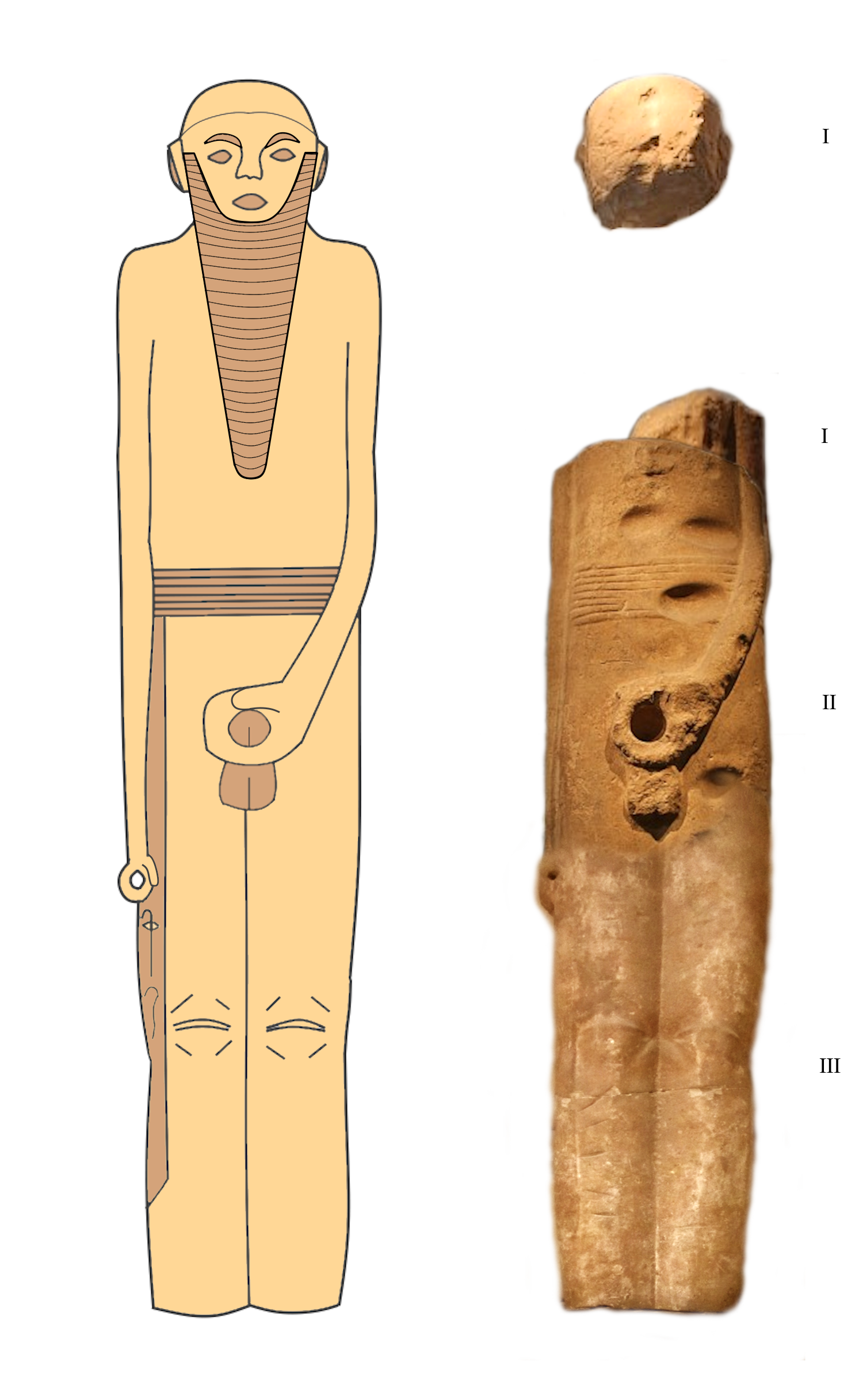
Reconstruction of the Koptos colossi, pre-dynastic colossal statues of the God Min, Koptos, late Naqada II- early Naqada III, about 3300 BCE.

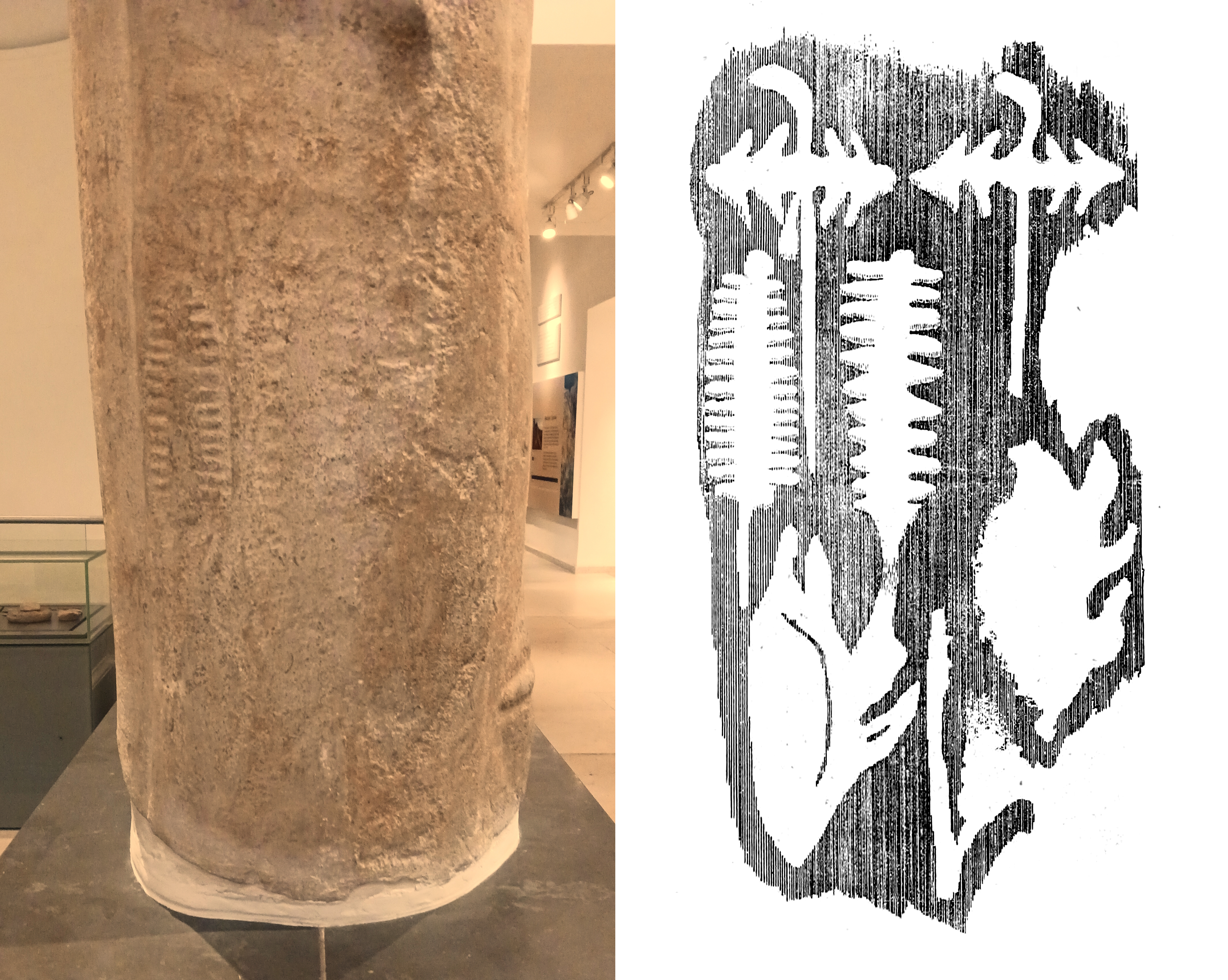
Engravings with the character for Min, with sawfish blades and shells, on one of the Koptos statues.

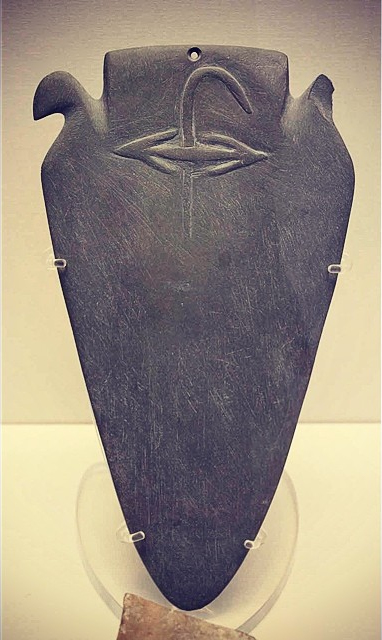
The Min Palette: a mudstone palette with the ancient hieroglyph for Min in relief. Late Predynastic, Naqada III. 3250-3100 BC. El-Amra

=== Dynastic period ===
His importance grew in the Middle Kingdom when he became even more closely linked with Horus as the deity Min-Horus. By the New Kingdom he was also fused with Amun in the form of Min-Amun, who was also the serpent Irta, a kamutef (the "bull of his mother" - a god who fathers himself with his own mother. The kamutf name is also used in reference to Horus-Min). Min as an independent deity was also a kamutef of Isis. One of Isis's many places of cult throughout the valley was at Min's temple in Koptos as his divine wife. Min's shrine was crowned with a pair of bull horns.

As the central deity of fertility and possibly orgiastic rites, Min became identified by the Greeks with the god Pan. One feature of Min worship was the wild prickly lettuce Lactuca serriola – the domestic version of which is Lactuca sativa (lettuce) – which has aphrodisiac and opiate qualities and produces latex when cut, possibly identified with semen. He also had connections with Nubia. However, his main centers of worship remained at Coptos and Akhmim (Khemmis).

Male deities as vehicles for fertility and potency rose to prevalence at the emergence of widespread agriculture. Male Egyptians would work in agriculture, making bountiful harvests a male-centered occasion. Thus, male gods of virility such as Osiris and Min were more developed during this time. Fertility was not associated with solely women, but with men as well, even increasing the role of the male in childbirth. As a god of male sexual potency, he was honoured during the coronation rites of the New Kingdom, when the Pharaoh was expected to sow his seed—generally thought to have been plant seeds. At the beginning of the harvest season, his image was taken out of the temple and brought to the fields in the festival of the departure of Min, the Min Festival, when they blessed the harvest, and played games naked in his honour, the most important of these being the climbing of a huge (tent) pole. This four day festival is evident from the great festivals list at the temple of Ramses III at Medinet Habu.

Cult and worship in the predynastic period surrounding a fertility god was based upon the fetish of fossilized belemnite. Later symbols widely used were the white bull, a barbed arrow, and a bed of lettuce, that the Egyptians believed to be an aphrodisiac. Egyptian lettuce was tall, straight, and released a milk-like sap when rubbed, characteristics superficially similar to the penis. Lettuce was sacrificially offered to the god, then eaten by men in an effort to achieve potency. Later pharaohs would offer the first fruits of harvest to the god to ensure plentiful harvest, with records of offerings of the first stems of sprouts of wheat being offered during the Ptolemaic period.

Civilians who were not able to formally practice the cult of Min paid homage to the god as sterility was an unfavorable condition looked upon with sorrow. Concubine figurines, ithyphallic statuettes, and ex-voto phalluses were placed at entrances to the houses of Deir el-Medina to honor the god in hopes of curing the disability. Egyptian women would touch the penises of statues of Min in hopes of pregnancy, a practice still continued today.

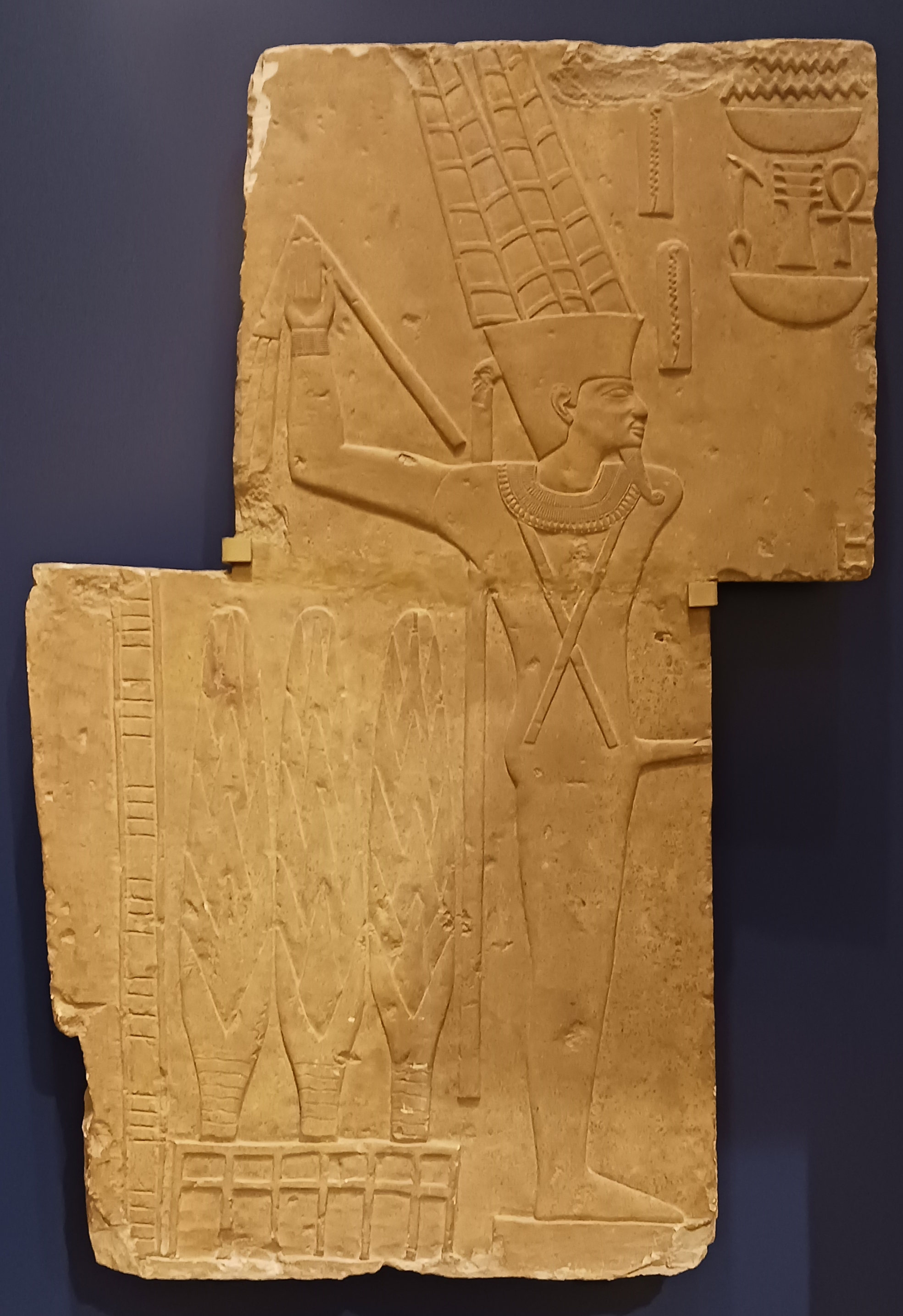
God Min, circa 1630 BCE. Min Temple of Koptos. King Intef V, 17th dynasty. Ashmolean Museum

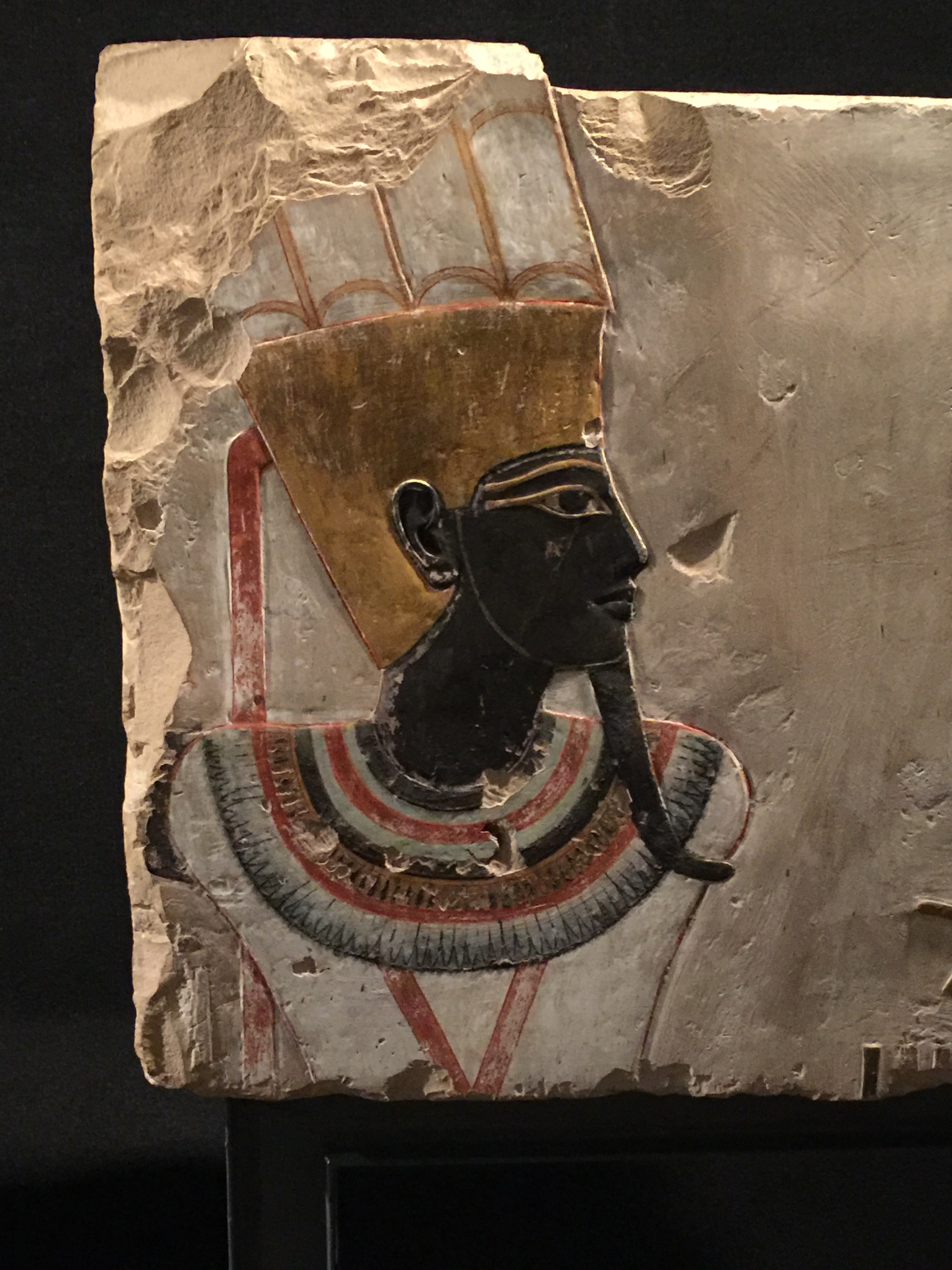
Min-Amun in a relief from the reign of Thutmose III (r.1479–1425 BCE) from Deir el-Bahari

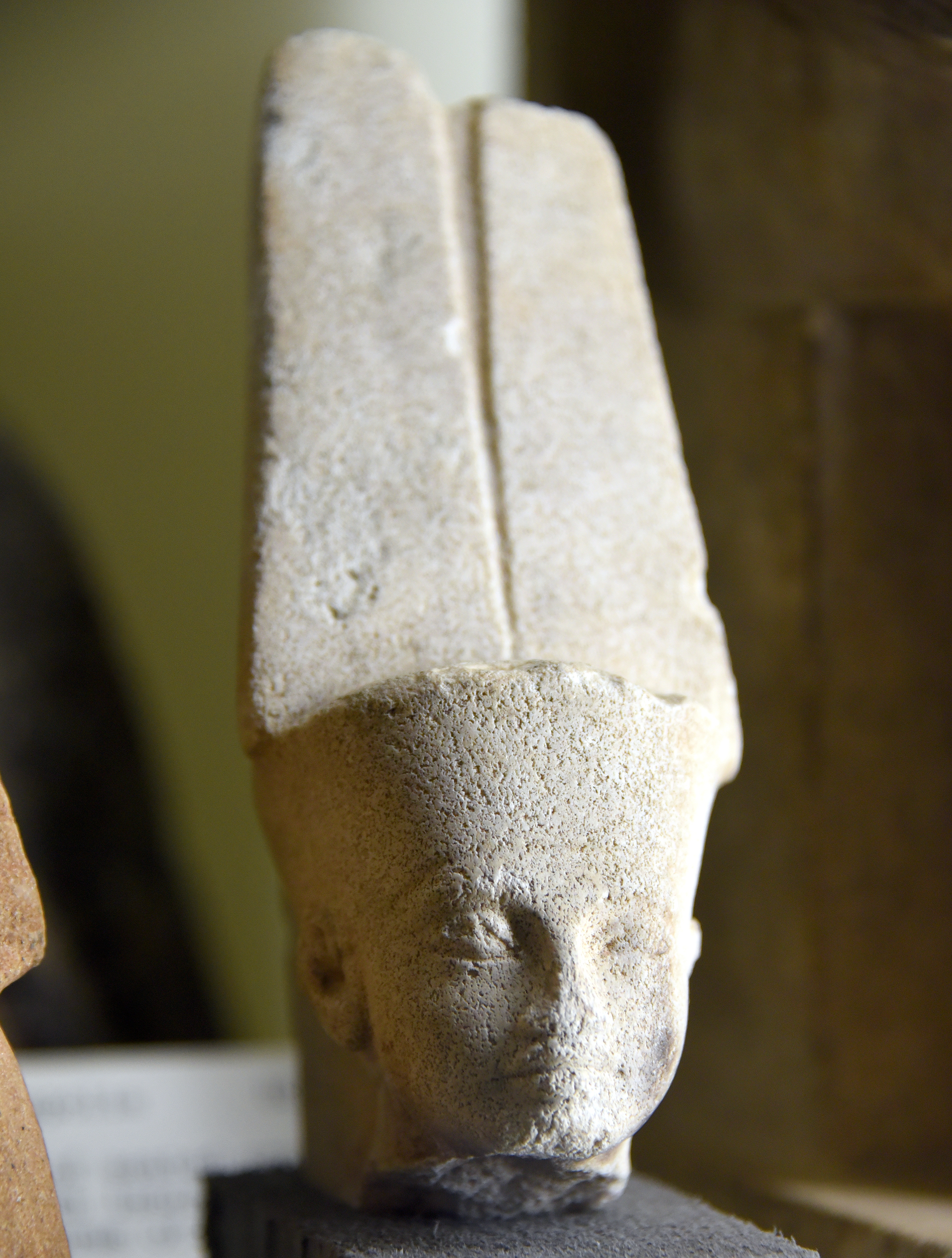
Head of the god Min-Amun wearing the double plume. Possibly reign of Tutankhamun, 14th century BCE. From Koptos (Qift), Egypt. Petrie Museum

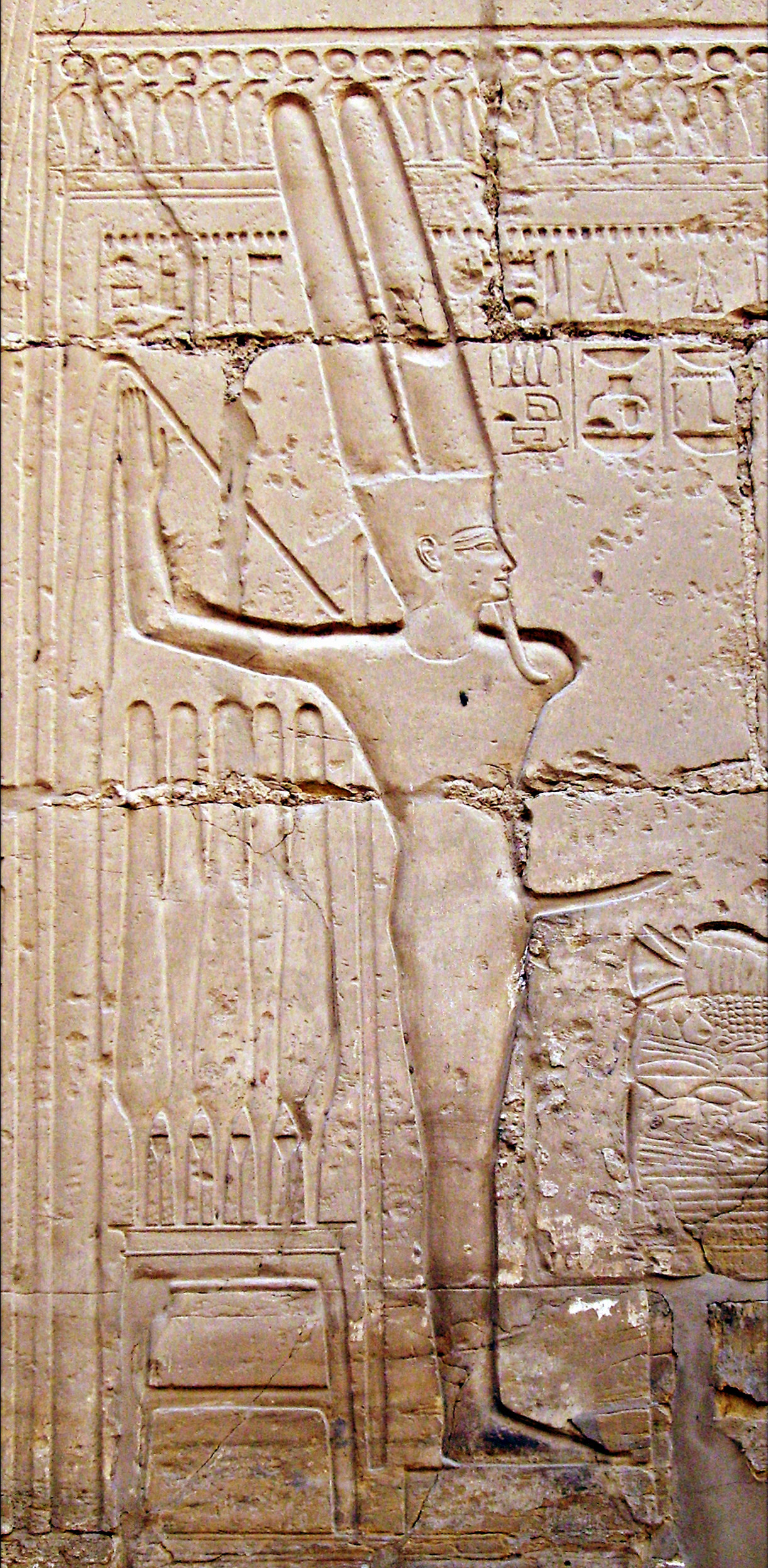
Belemnite shown on left of Min-Amun

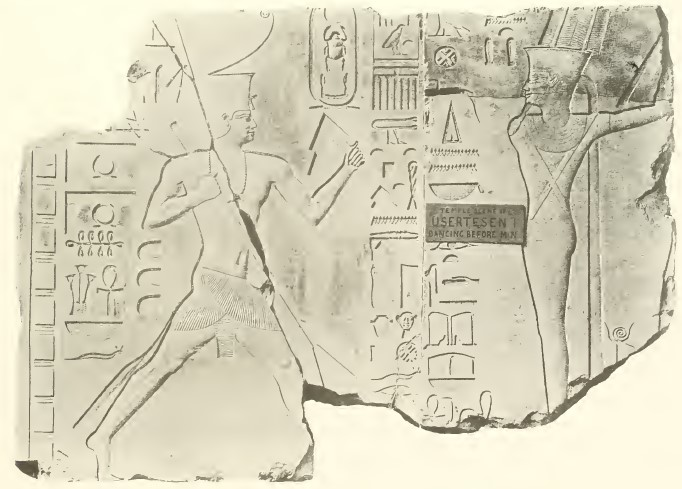
A board has been placed over Min-Amun's penis in the 19th century report by Petrie

== Appearance ==
In Egyptian art, Min is depicted as an anthropomorphic male deity with a masculine body, covered in shrouds, wearing a crown with feathers, and often holding his erect penis in his left hand and an object that is possibly a stylised form of flail (referring to his authority, or rather that of the pharaohs) in his upward-facing right hand. Around his forehead, Min wears a red ribbon that trails to the ground, claimed by some to represent sexual energy. The legs are bandaged because of his chthonic force, in the same manner as Ptah and Osiris. His skin was usually painted black, which symbolized the fertile soil of the Nile. A votive panel, with a painting of Min from the Roman period, shows him in the naturalistic style used at the time in both mummy portraits and votive panels.

== Family ==
In Hymn to Min it is said:

Min, Lord of the Processions, God of the High Plumes, Son of Osiris and Isis, Venerated in Ipu...

... Min, Lord of the Processions, God of the High Plumes, Son of Osiris and Isis, venerated in Ipu, Gebtu's Horus of the Strong Arm.

-- Hymn to Min

Min's wives were Iabet and Repyt (Repit).

Isis is the mother of Min as well as his wife.

== Ejaculation legend ==
There have been controversial suggestions, by authors such as British journalist Jonathan Margolis, that the pharaoh was expected to demonstrate, as part of a Min festival, that he could ejaculate—and thus ensure the annual flooding of the Nile. According to Egyptologists Kara Cooney, professor of ancient Egyptian art and architecture at UCLA, and her colleague Jonathan Winnerman, no hard evidence of that exists. The myth may have originated from a misinterpretation of a different festival.

== See also ==
- List of Egyptian deities
