= Naqada (disambiguation) =

Naqada is a town on the west bank of the Nile River in Egypt.

Naqada may also refer to:

- Naqada culture, a material culture in Predynastic Egypt, or one of its sub-periods:
  - Naqada I, also called the Amratian culture
  - Naqada II, also called the Gerzeh culture
  - Naqada III, also called the Protodynastic period or Semainean culture

== See also ==
- Naqadeh, Iranian town
- Nakada, a Japanese surname
