= Nakada =

Nakada (written: 中田) is a Japanese surname. Notable people with the surname include:

- Akira Nakada (中田 章; 1886–1931), Japanese composer, father of Yoshinao
- Asumi Nakada (中田 あすみ; born 1988), Japanese voice actress and child model
- Ayu Nakada (仲田 歩夢; born 1993), Japanese footballer
- Hiroki Nakada (中田 大貴; born 1992), Japanese footballer
- Hiroshi Nakada (中田 宏; born 1964), Japanese politician
- Juji Nakada (中田 重治; 1870–1939), co-founder of OMS International and first bishop of Japan Holiness Church
- Kana Nakada (中田 花奈), Japanese mahjong player, television personality, entrepreneur, and author
- Kenji Nakada (仲田 建二; born 1973), former Japanese footballer
- Kumi Nakada (中田 久美; born 1965), Japanese volleyball player
- Pedro Pablo Nakada Ludeña (born 1973), Peruvian serial killer
- Yohei Nakada (中田 洋平; born 1983), former Japanese footballer
- Yoshinao Nakada (中田 喜直; 1923–2000), Japanese composer
- Nakada brothers, nine American siblings who enlisted during World War II

== See also ==
- Nakata, using the same kanji (中田)
- Naqada (disambiguation)
