= Nakata =

Nakata (written: 中田, literally central rice field) is a Japanese surname. Notable people with the surname include:

- Daisuke Nakata (中田 大輔, born 1974), Japanese trampolinist and Sasuke competitor
- Hideo Nakata (中田 秀夫, born 1961), Japanese film director
- Hidetoshi Nakata (中田 英寿, born 1977), Japanese footballer
- Hiroki Nakata (中田 宏樹, 1964–2023), Japanese shogi player
- Jouji Nakata (中田 譲治, born 1954), Japanese voice actor
- Kazuhiro Nakata (中田 和宏, born 1958), Japanese voice actor
- Kōji Nakata (中田 浩二, born 1979), Japanese footballer
- Masako Nakata (中田 正子, 1910–2002), Japanese lawyer
- Shigeo Nakata (中田 茂男, born 1945), Japanese sport wrestler
- Yasutaka Nakata (中田 ヤスタカ, born 1980), Japanese music producer and DJ
- Yuki Nakata (中田 有紀, born 1977), Japanese heptathlete
- Miho Nakata (born 1989), Japanese ultramarathon runner

== Fictional characters ==
- Tsumugi Nakata, character from the anime series Soaring Sky! Pretty Cure

== See also ==
- Nakata Station, railway station in Tsugaru, Aomori Prefecture, Japan
- Nakada, and Tanaka (disambiguation), other Japanese surnames using the same kanji 中田.
