= Naqada I =

Archaeological culture of prehistoric Upper Egypt

Naqada I (3900—3500 BC)
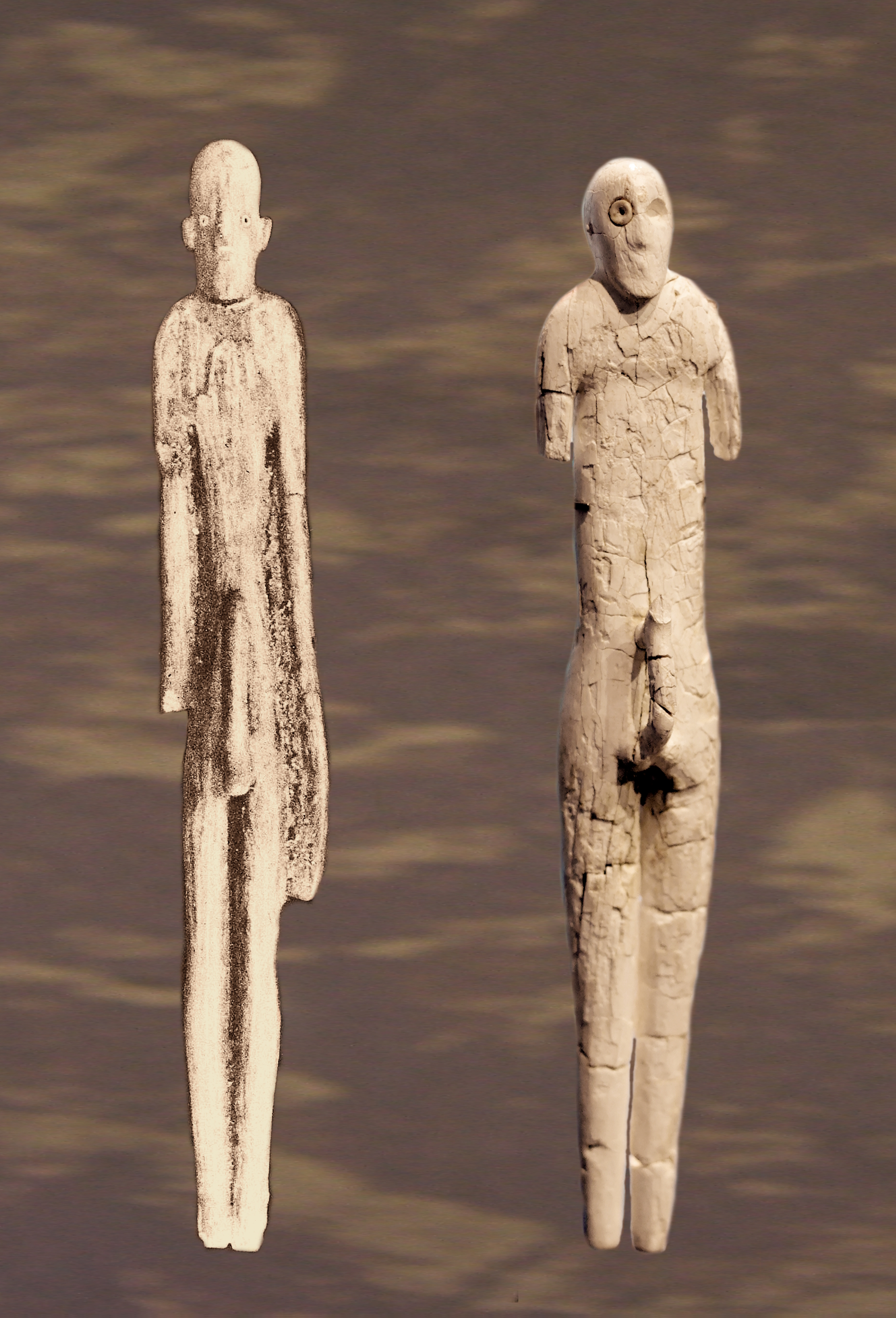
- Naqada I ivory statuettes of men with penile sheathes (El Mahasna left, and Naqada right, c.3900-3600 BCE).
- Dates: c.3750 BC — c.3500 BC.
- Major sites: El-Amrah, Naqada
- Preceded by: Tasian culture, Badari culture, Merimde culture
- Followed by: Naqada II (Gerzeh culture)

The Naqada I culture, originally called the Amratian culture, was the first Pre-dynastic archaeological culture of prehistoric Egypt, centering on Upper Egypt. Depending on the sources, it lasted approximately from 3,750 to 3,500 BC, from c. 4,000/3,900 to c. 3,600 BC, or from 4,000 to 3,500 BC. It corresponds to the original Flinders Petrie "Sequence Dates" SD 31–37.

All Naqada I sites are located in Upper Egypt, ranging from Matmar in the north, to Kubaniya and Khor Bahan in the south. The Amratian/ Naqada I culture is broadly similar to the previous Badarian culture, and may to some extent be considered as a later variation, characterized with more diversity in the types of graves, and therefore the appearance of a level of social hierarchy.

== Overview ==
The Amratian culture is named after the archaeological site of el-Amrah, located around 120 km (75 mi) south of Badari in Upper Egypt. El-Amrah was the first site where this culture group was found without being mingled with the later Gerzeh culture (Naqada II). However, this period is better attested at the Naqada site, thus it also is referred to as the Naqada I culture.

Naqada I sites are only known from the area of Upper Egypt, with sites ranging from Badari in the north to a few sites in Aswan in Lower Nubia.

=== Pottery types ===
The Naqada I period corresponds to the maximum development of black-topped red ware, as well as wares with painted white motifs on a polished red background.

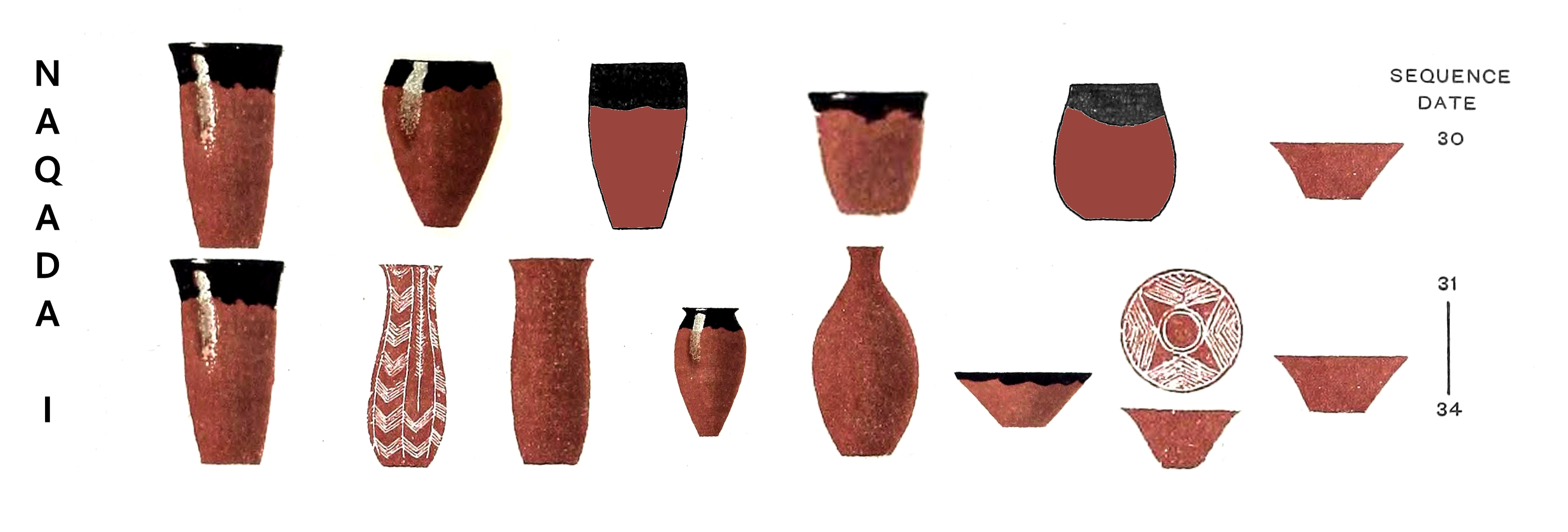
Naqada I pottery, per Flinders Petrie

Naqada I pottery mainly used one type of clay: a grey clay from the alluvium of the Nile, which is rich in ferrous oxide and becomes red to brown upon firing in an oxidizing environment.

Naqada I had four types of potteries, which were categorized chronologically by Petrie from SD ("Sequence Date") 30 to 37:

- Black Top ware (type "B", all Naqada I): Polished red body with black top
- Polished Red ware (type "P", all Naqada I): red polished pottery
- White cross-lined ware (type "C", Naqada IC): Polished red body with white painting
- Fancy Forms ware (type "F", Naqada IC): Pottery with fancy shapes or animal-shaped

==== Black-topped pottery ("B-ware") ====
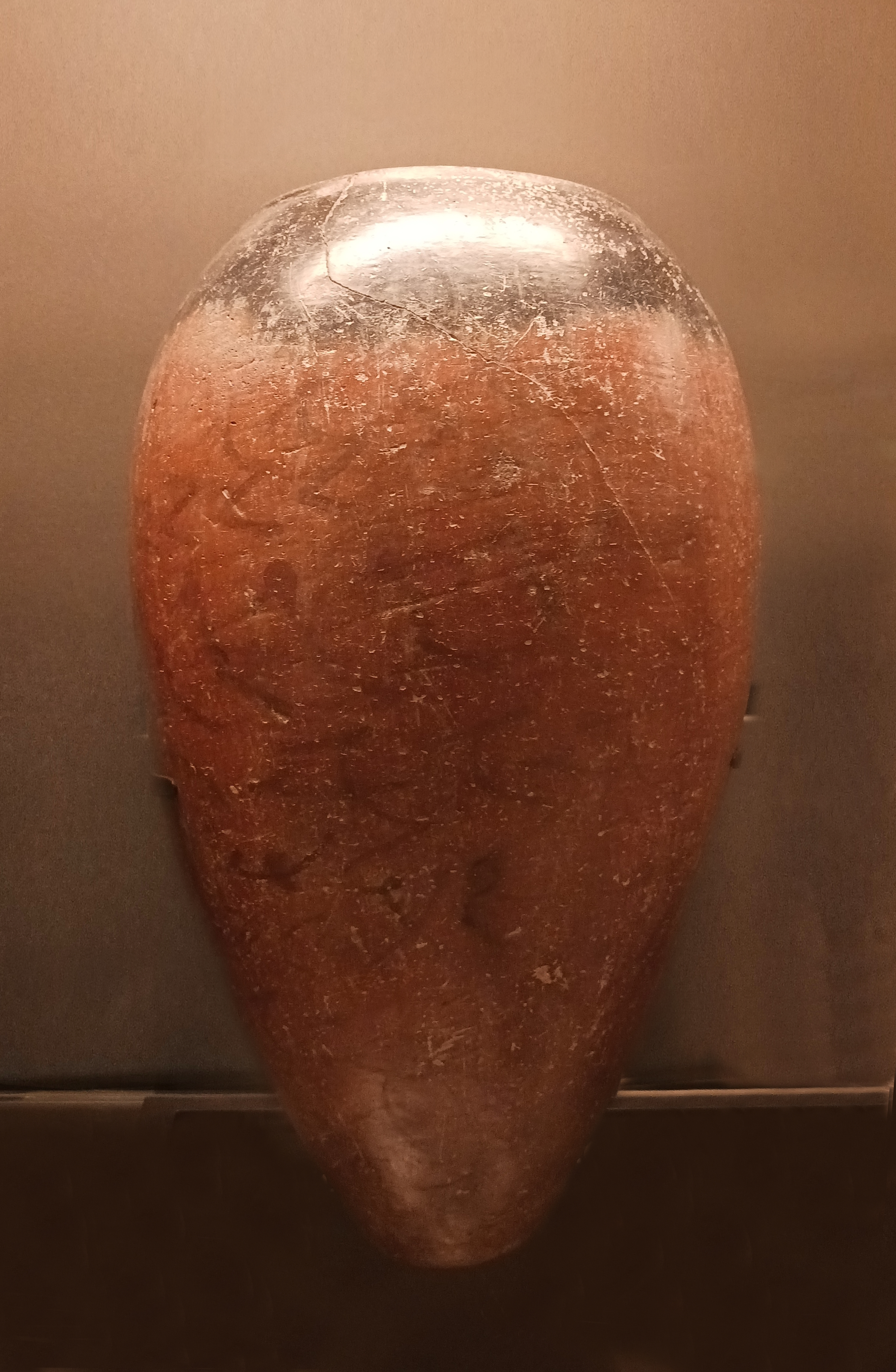
Black-top red ware. Naqada I-first half of Naqada II. 3800-3400 BCE. Louvre Museum

Red-bodied black-topped pottery, already found in the Badarian culture was continuously produced. The red color of the body was a natural result of firing Nilotic clay rich in ferrous oxide, but the black top was obtained by exposing the top portion of the vessels to dense black soot. Although mostly characteristic of Naqada I, this type continued to be produced throughout the whole Naqada period.

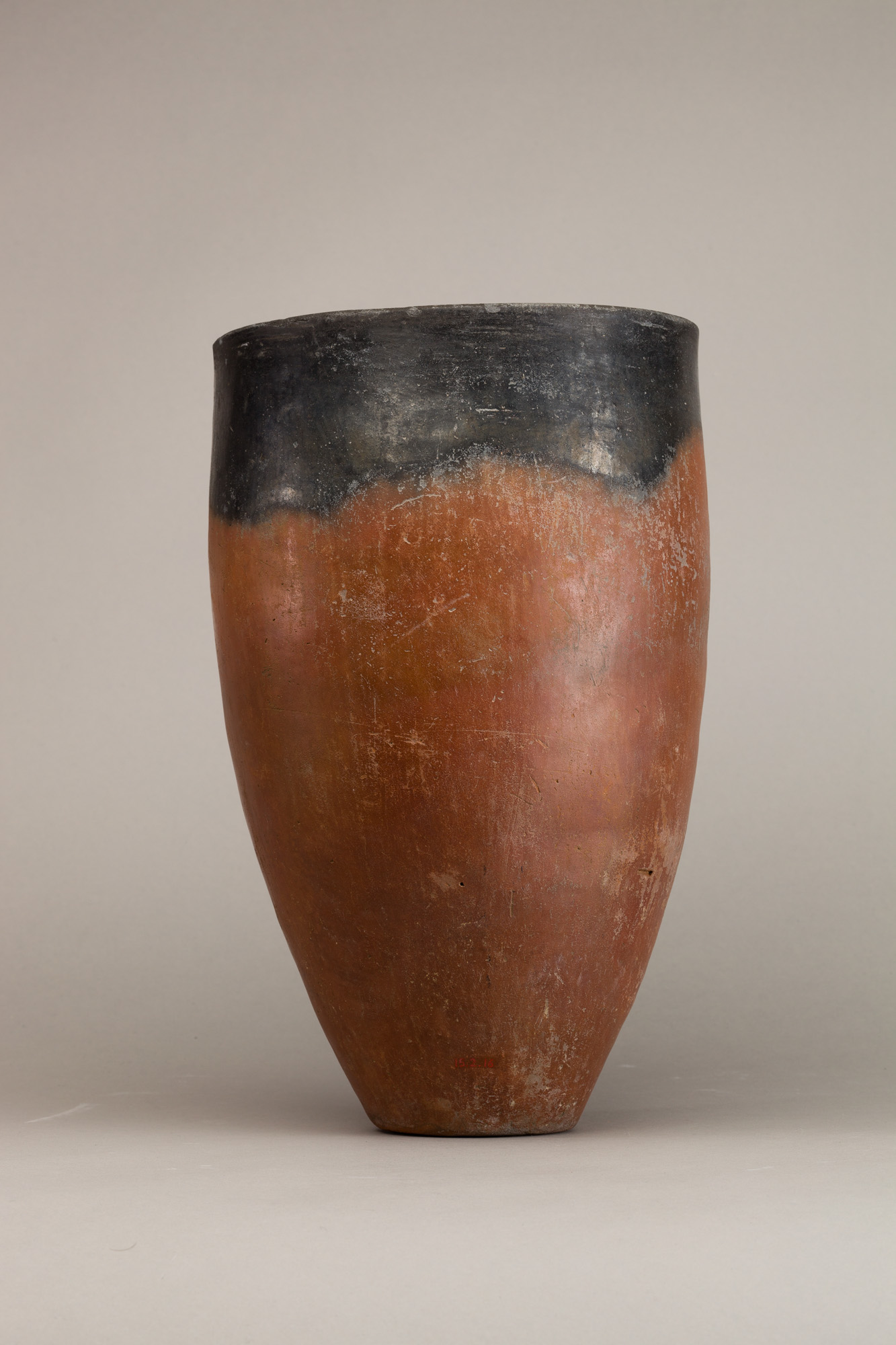
Black-topped Red Ware beaker

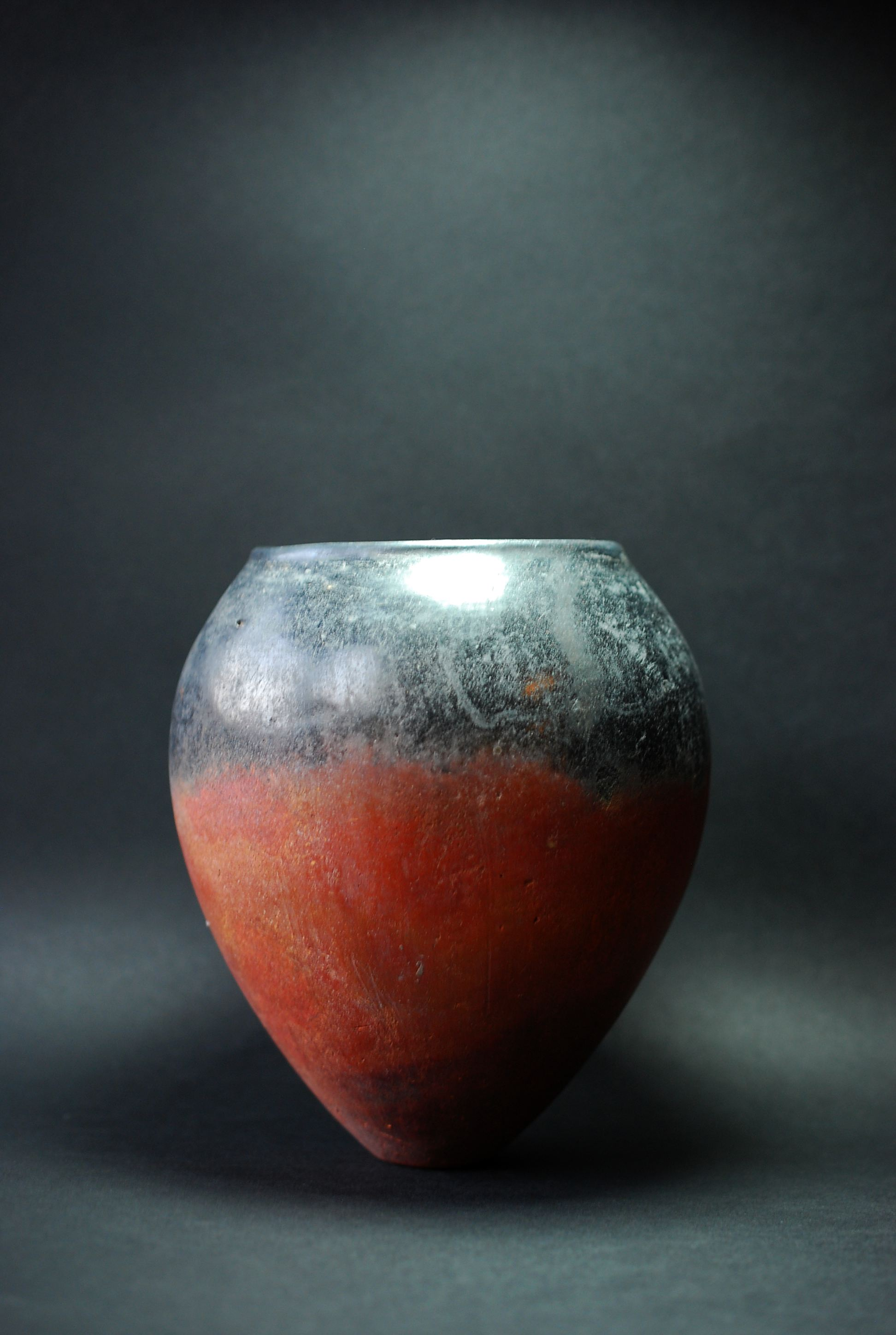
Ovoid Naqada I (Amratian) black-topped terracotta vase, c. 3800–3500 BC

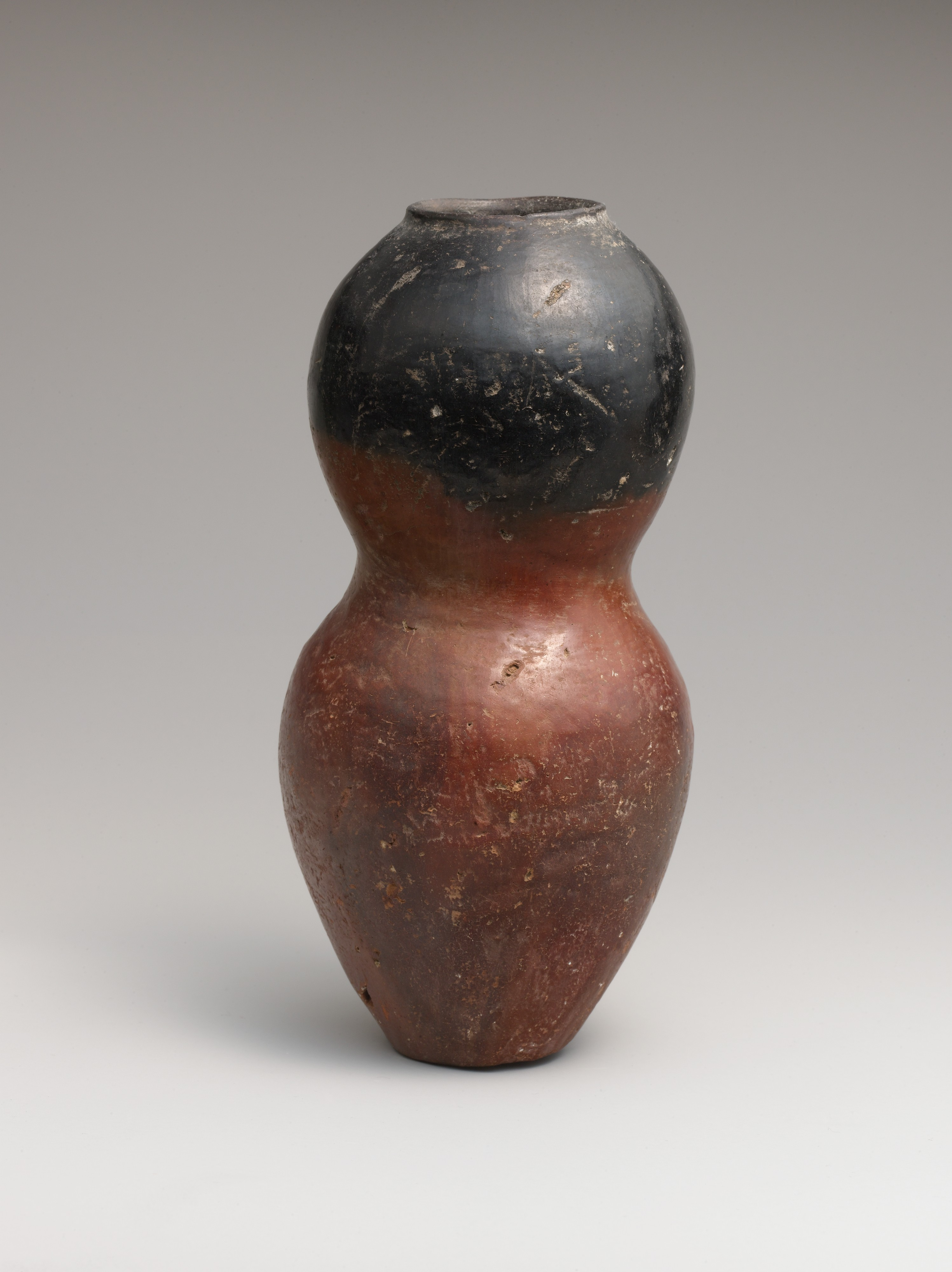
Black-topped red ware jar

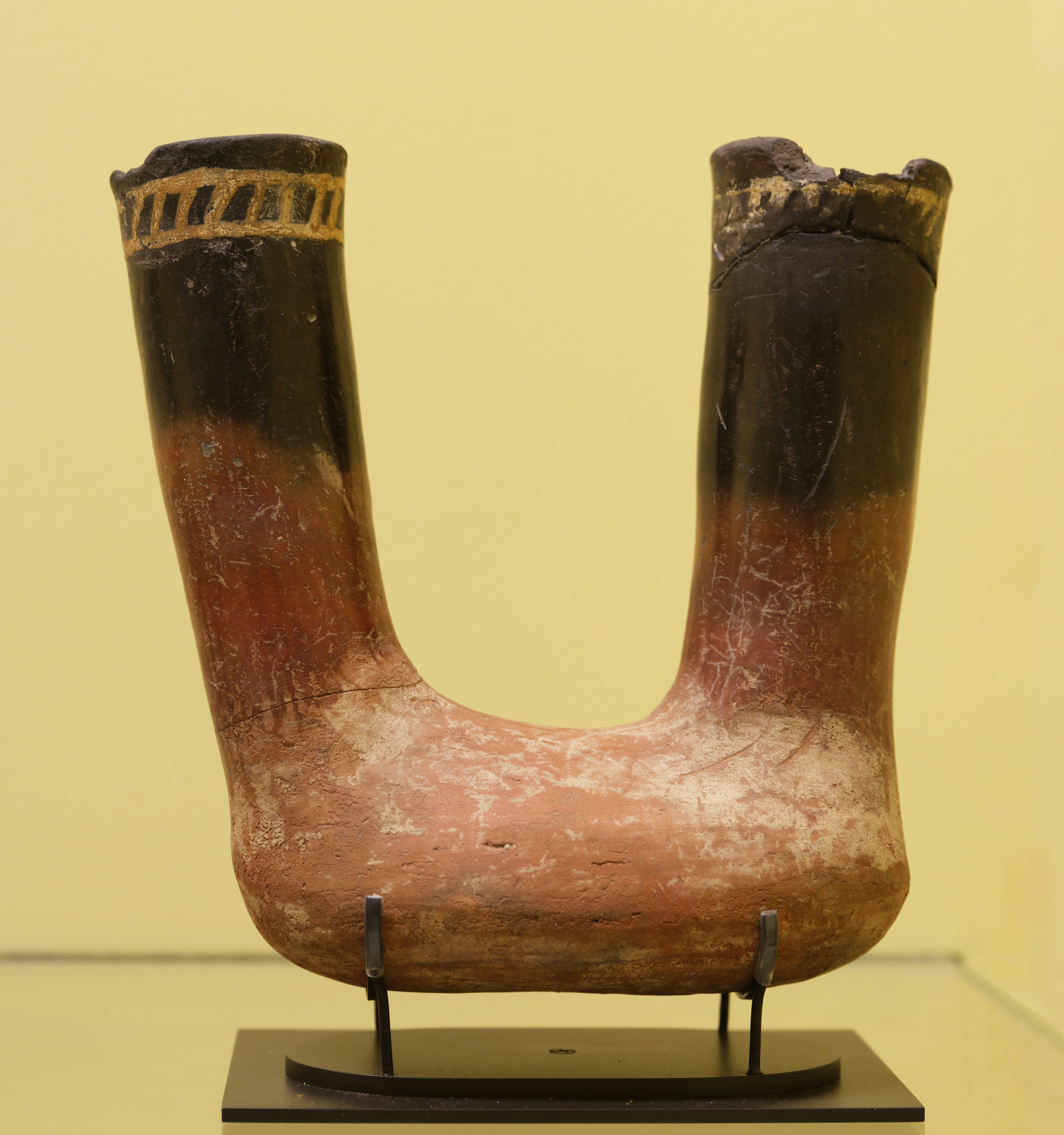
A "fancy" (Type "F") shape: double vase. Louvre Museum.

==== Cross-lined pottery (C-ware) ====
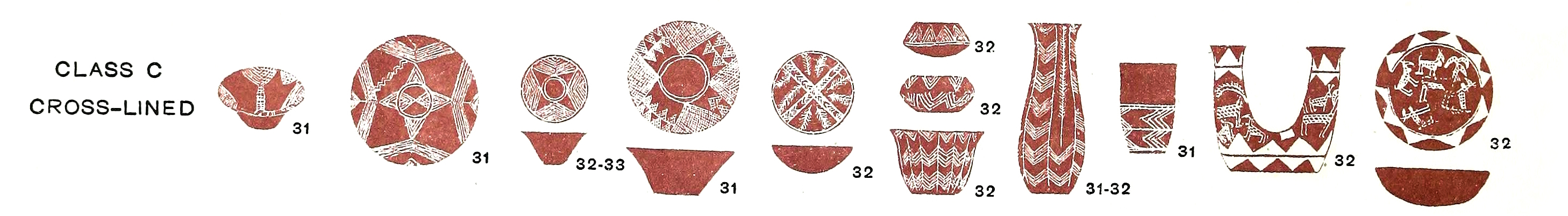
C-ware, Naqada I

White cross-lined pottery (C-ware) were a type of painted pottery essentially specific to Naqada I. Compared to the total number of ceramics produced, only very few of them were painted. The painting technique too was different from Naqada II, in that white or cream white painting was used over a red background, while Naqada II used brown painting over cream-bodied pottery. These vessels were found in graves, but were also used in daily life. In addition to the different types of ceramic base and the different colors used for painting, the types of drawings and well as their style also differ widely between Naqada I and Naqada II. White cross-lined pottery on a red background often used close parallel white lines being crossed by another set of close parallel white lines. Overall, the layout of drawing in C-ware was more free than that of the Naqada D-ware, a possible consequence of increased hierarchy and control in society.

C-ware covers a period from 3,900 to 3,650 BC, and was produced from Naqada IA to Naqada IIA and Naqada IIB, before vanishing. Some paintings also depict a triumphant warrior with his captives, a likely prototype of later scenes of pharaohs smiting their enemies.

===== Geometric symbols and natural scenes =====
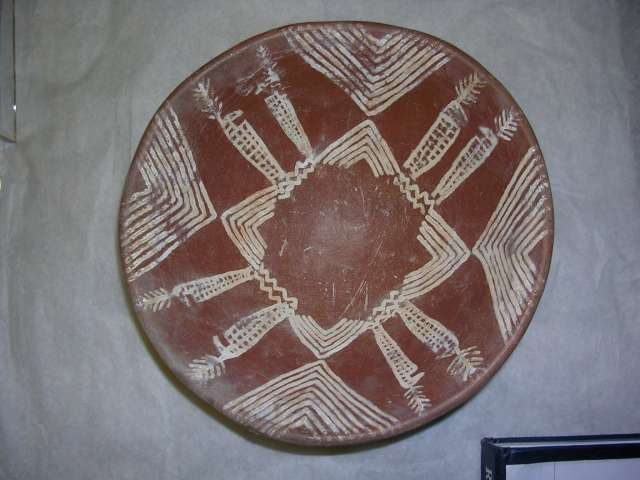
Red pottery bowl or drinking vessel with interior geometric decoration.

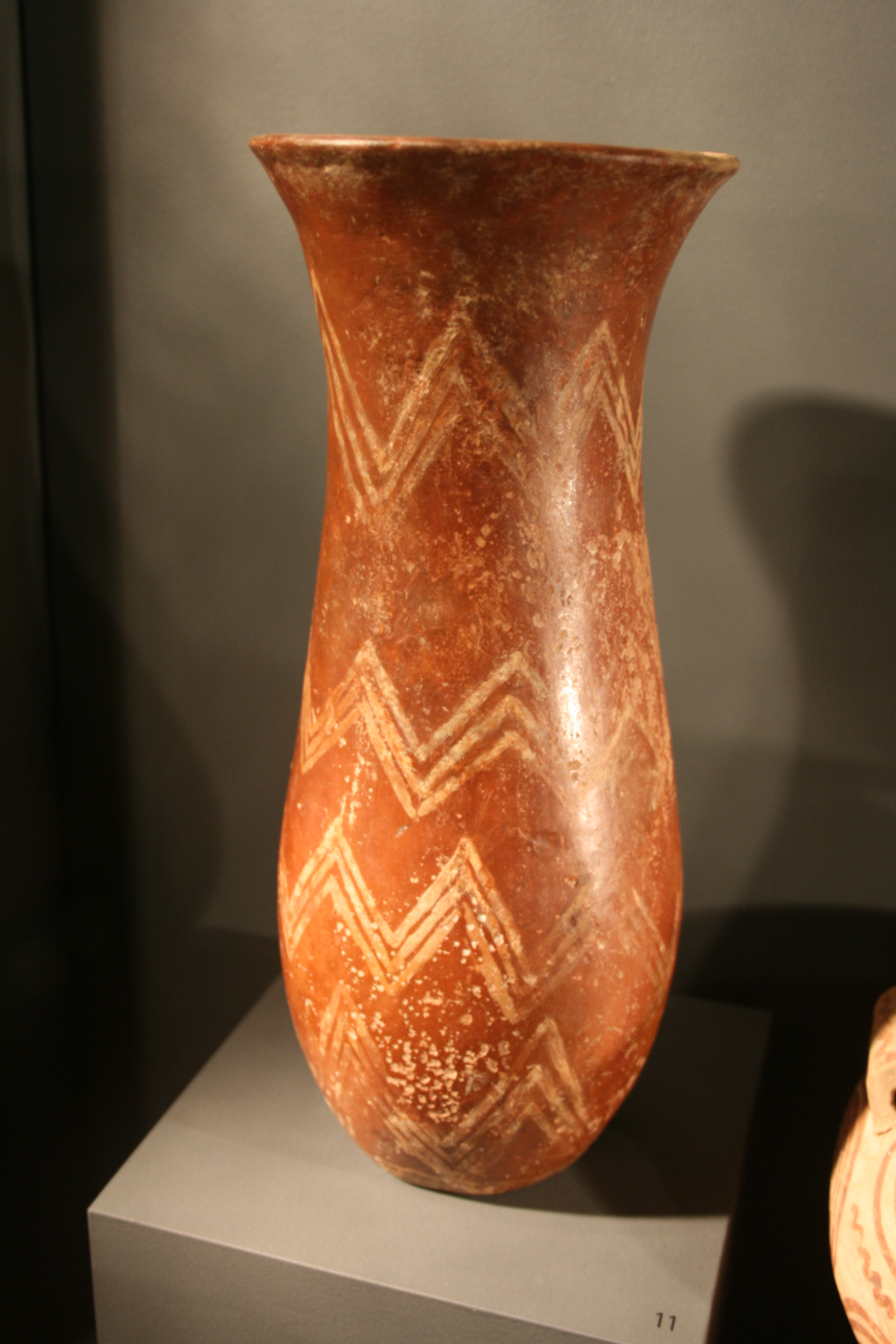
Vase, Amratian, Naqada I

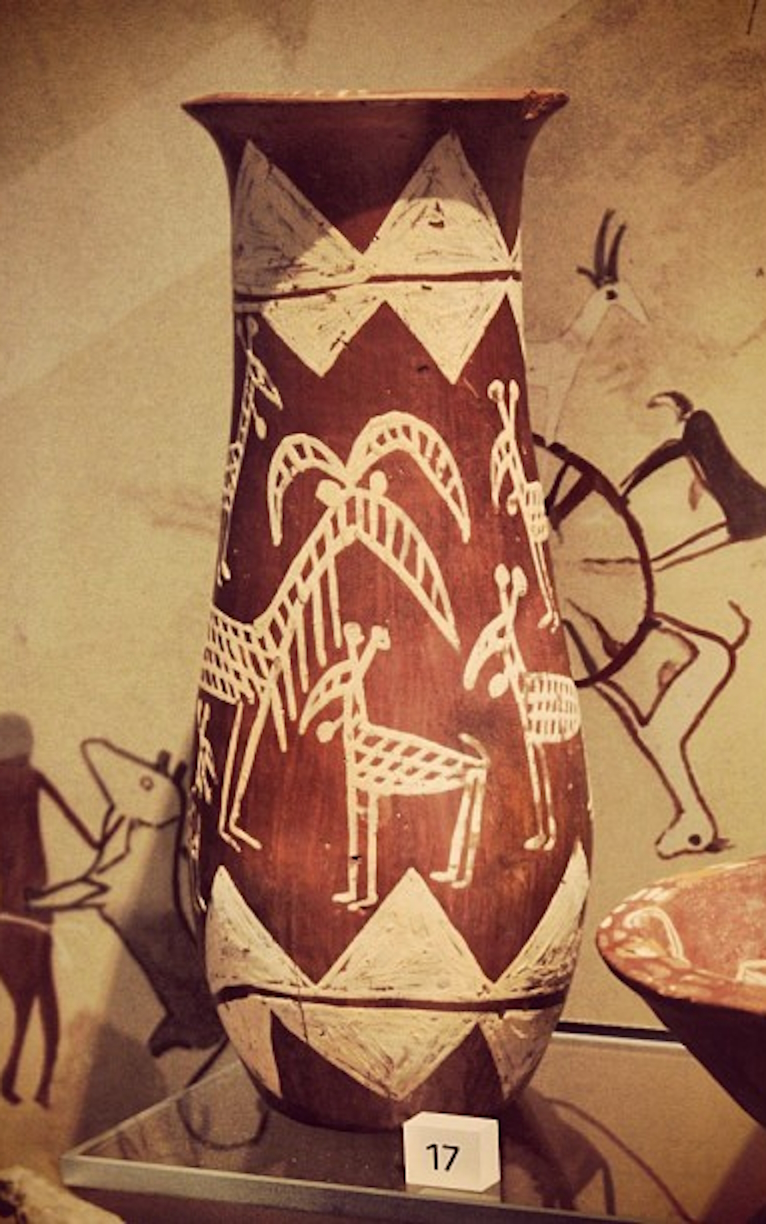
C-ware jar with animals. Circa 3700 BC. Naqada IC.

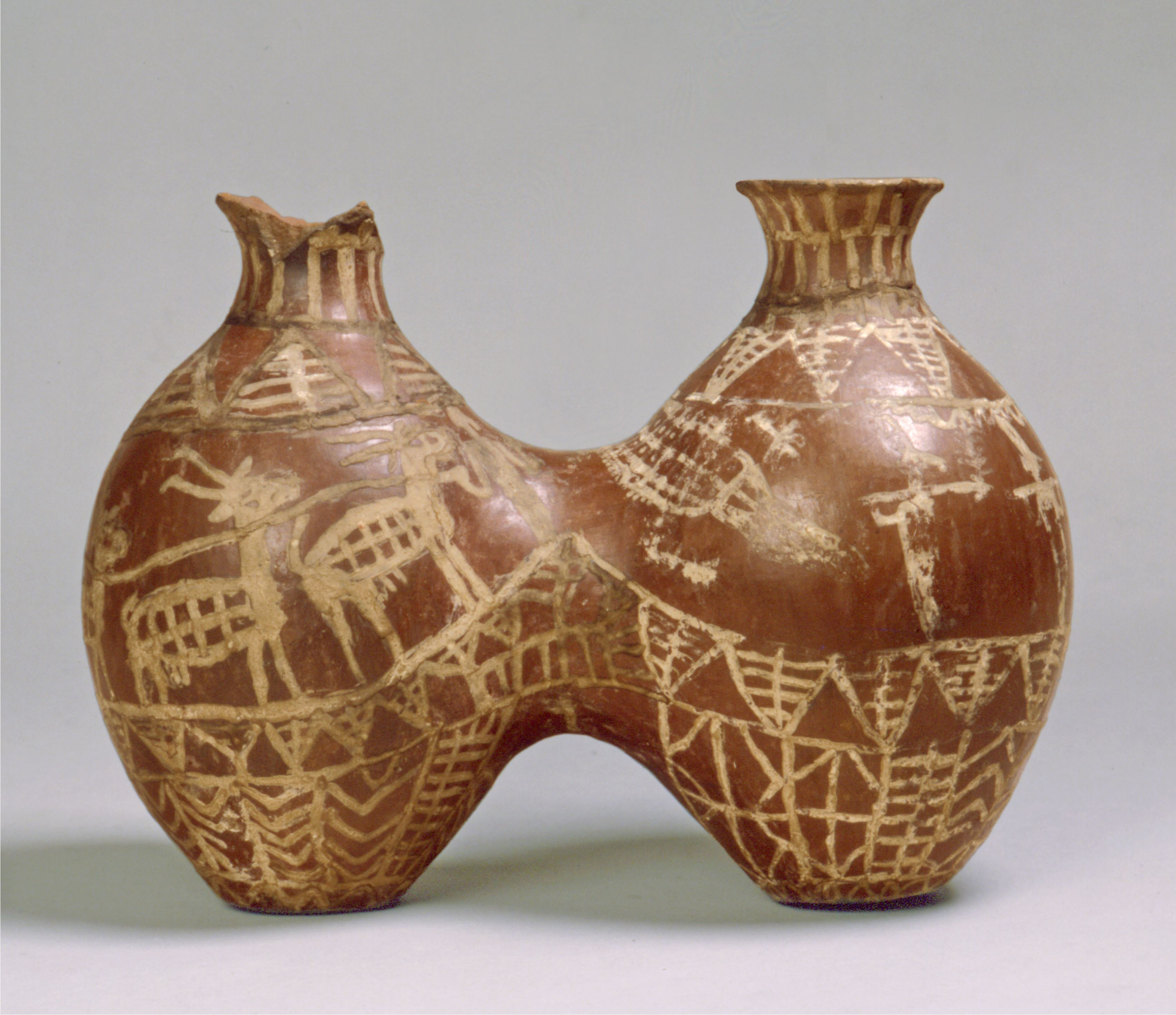
Double jar with animals being hunted. Museo Egizio, Turin.

===== Human figures =====
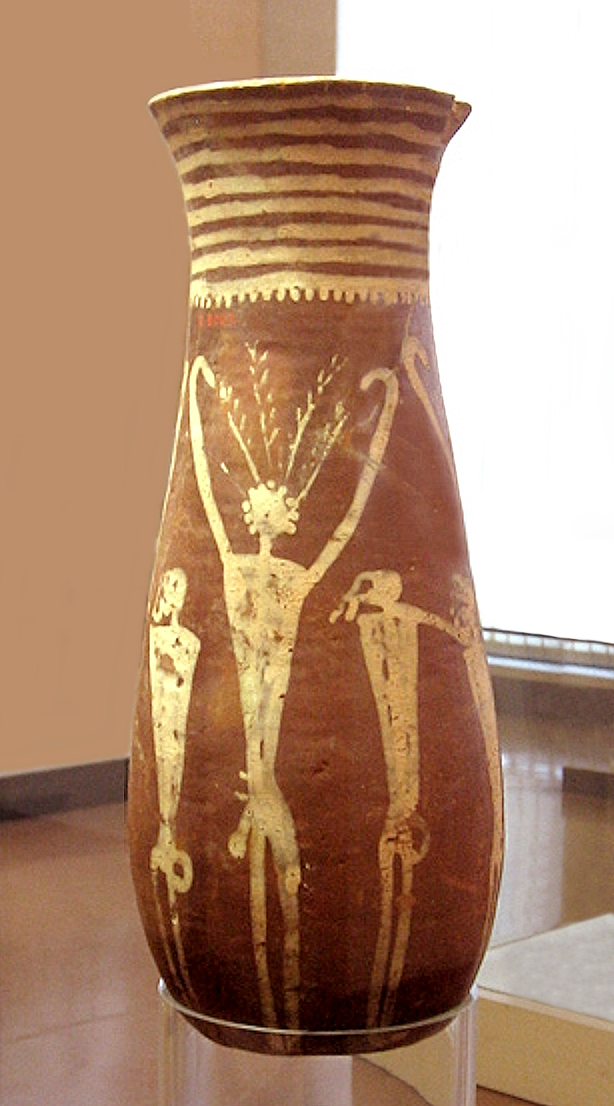
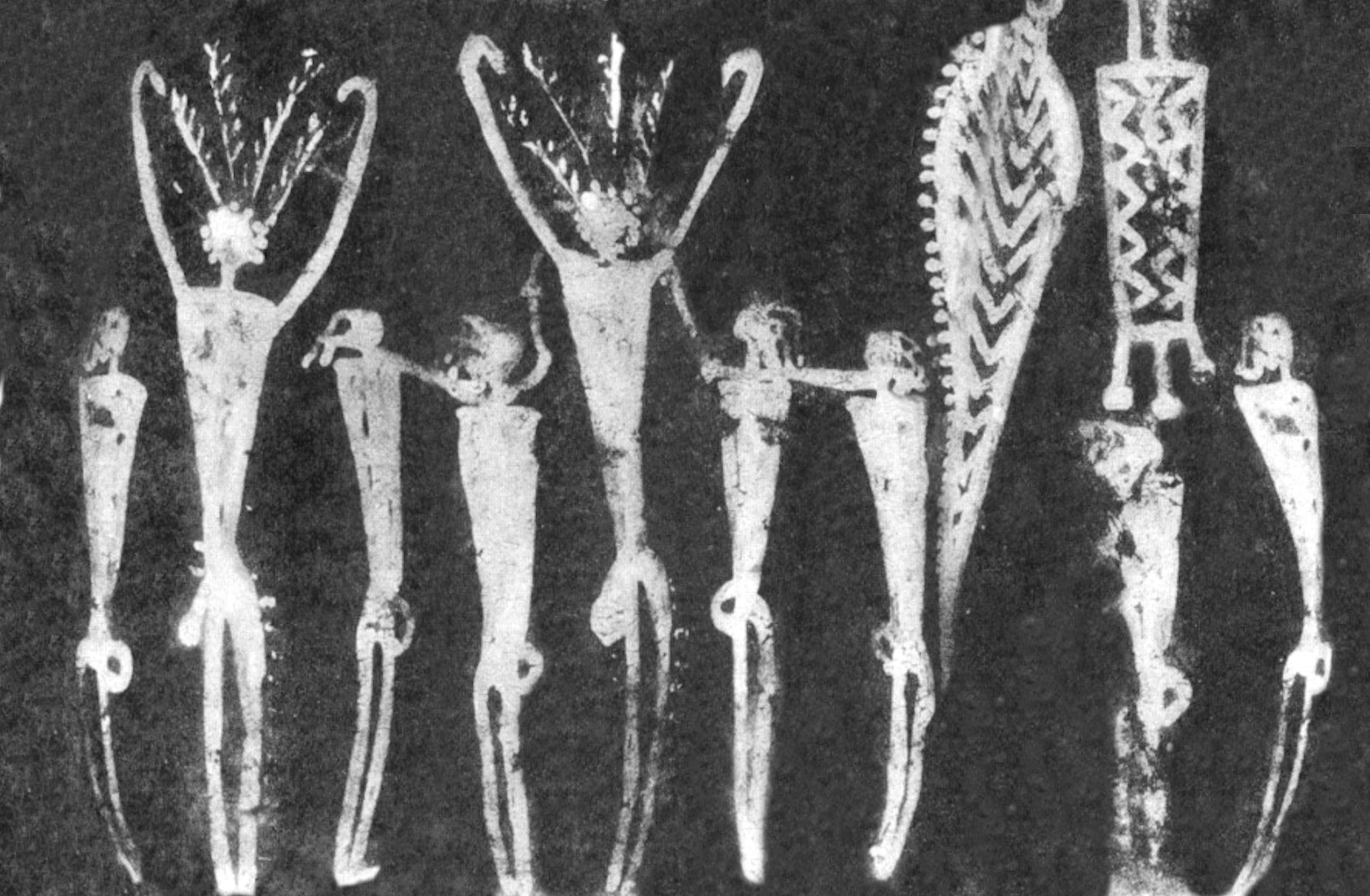
Vase with victorious human figures, and smaller individuals attached with a rope at the neck. Naqada IC-IIA (c. 3800-3600 BC). Royal Museums of Art and History, E3002.

A few scenes on Cross-lined pottery (C-ware) depict human figures of the Naqada I period. One depicts a hunter brandishing a bow and holding four dogs on leashes. Several other scenes depicts hunters using harpoons, or herders guiding animals. One scene even seems to represent a man on a boat fishing.

One of the most famous and ambitious scenes is depicted on Jar E3002 in the Royal Museums of Art and History, Brussels, dated to Naqada IC-IIA (c. 3800-3600 BC). It shows eight individuals in a warlike scene. Two tall figures, equipped with long feathers in their heads, short curly hair, a penile sheath and seemingly an animal tail attached at their waist, raise their arms above their heads in an apparent sign of victory. The smaller figures are apparently arm-less, have flowing hair, and the phallus appears as a curved handle. Four of the smaller figures are attached to the central victor with ropes at their necks.

These scenes of warfare in the Nile Valley are dated to Naqada IC, and may be a prelude to future scenes of Pharaohs smiting their enemies. The scene is similar to that depicted in another vase with a victorious or dancing figure holding a prisoner, now in the Petrie Museum. The raised arms posture of the victor would appear in many statuettes and pottery paintings of the Naqada II period, but as an essentially female posture.

Although men with beards are ubiquitous in sculptural works at the end of the period, they never appear in pottery paintings.

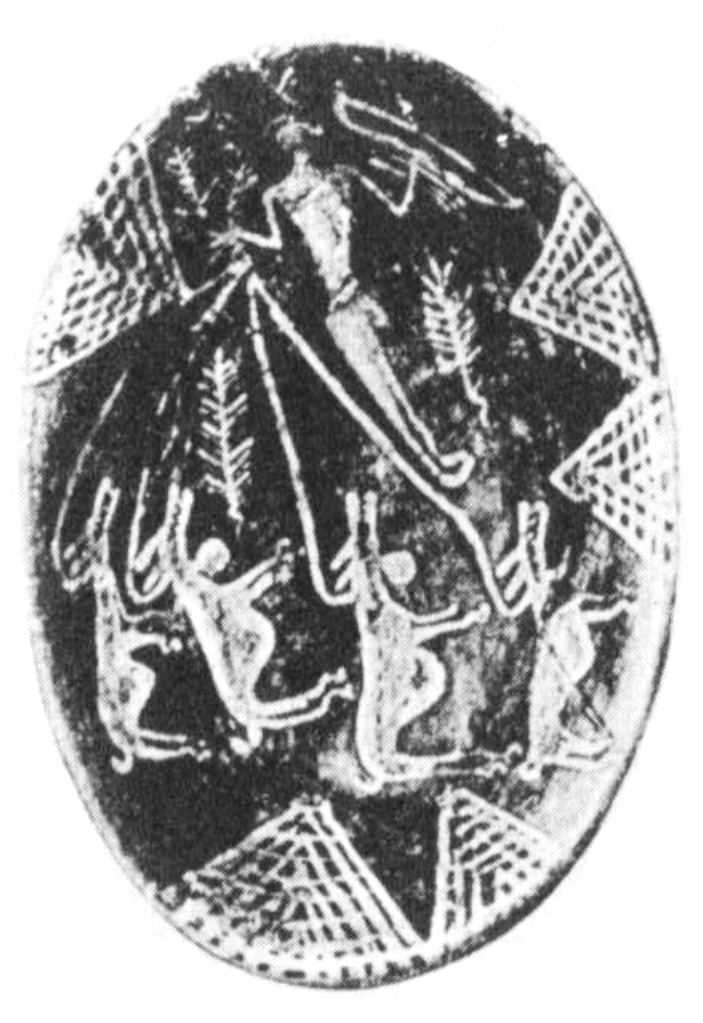
Plate with hunter with dogs on leash. Naqada I. Pushkin Museum.

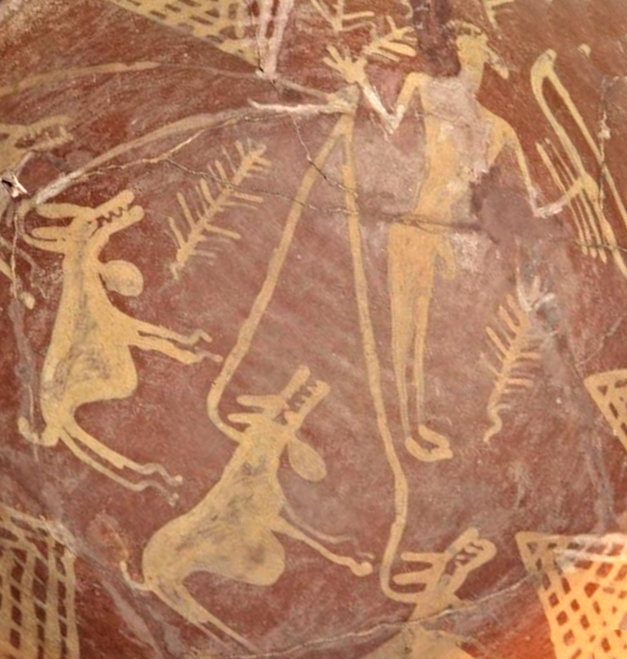
Detail of a plate with hunter with dogs on leash. Naqada I. Pushkin Museum.

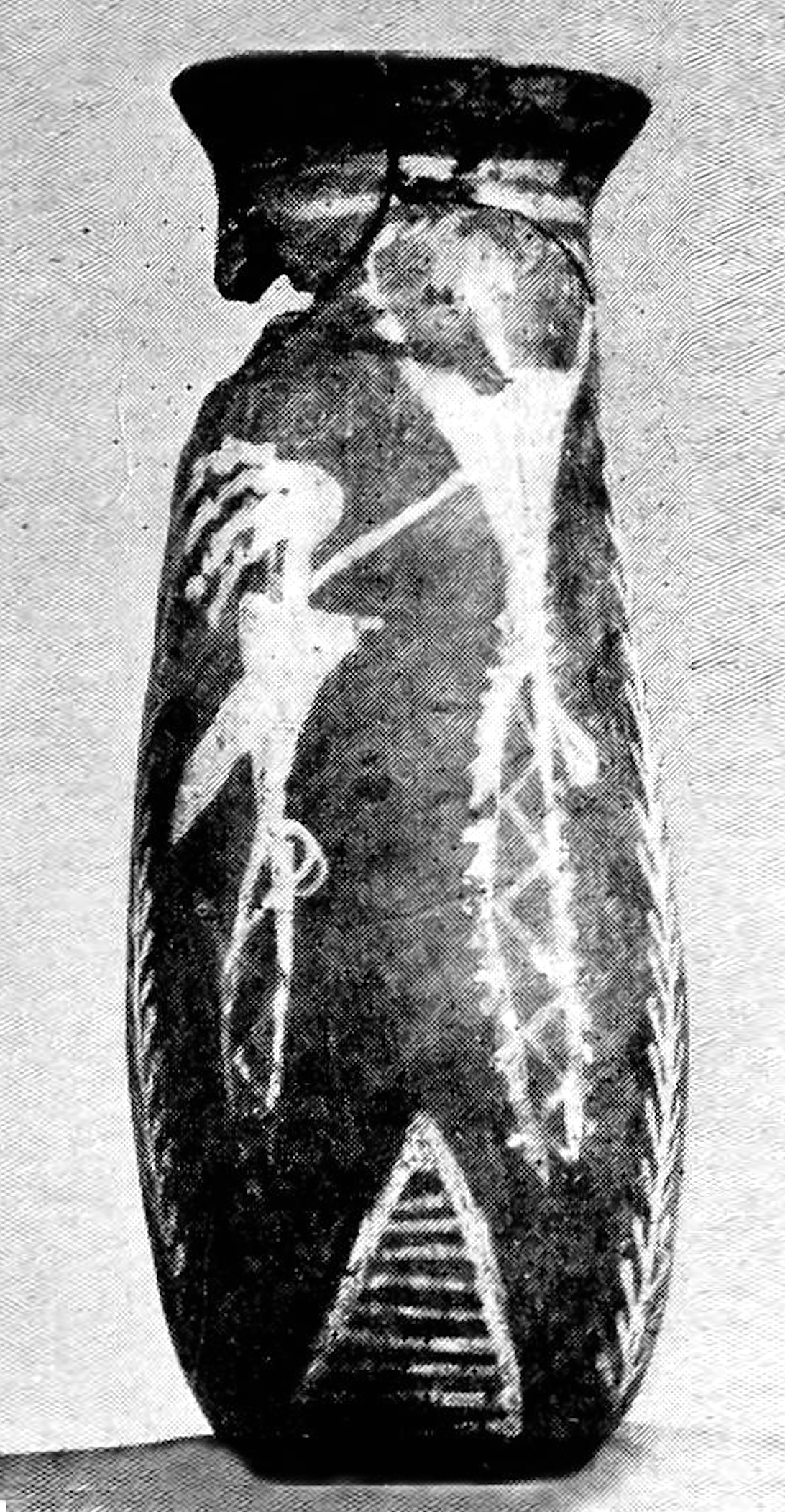
Victorious figure with prisoner, or dancing scene.

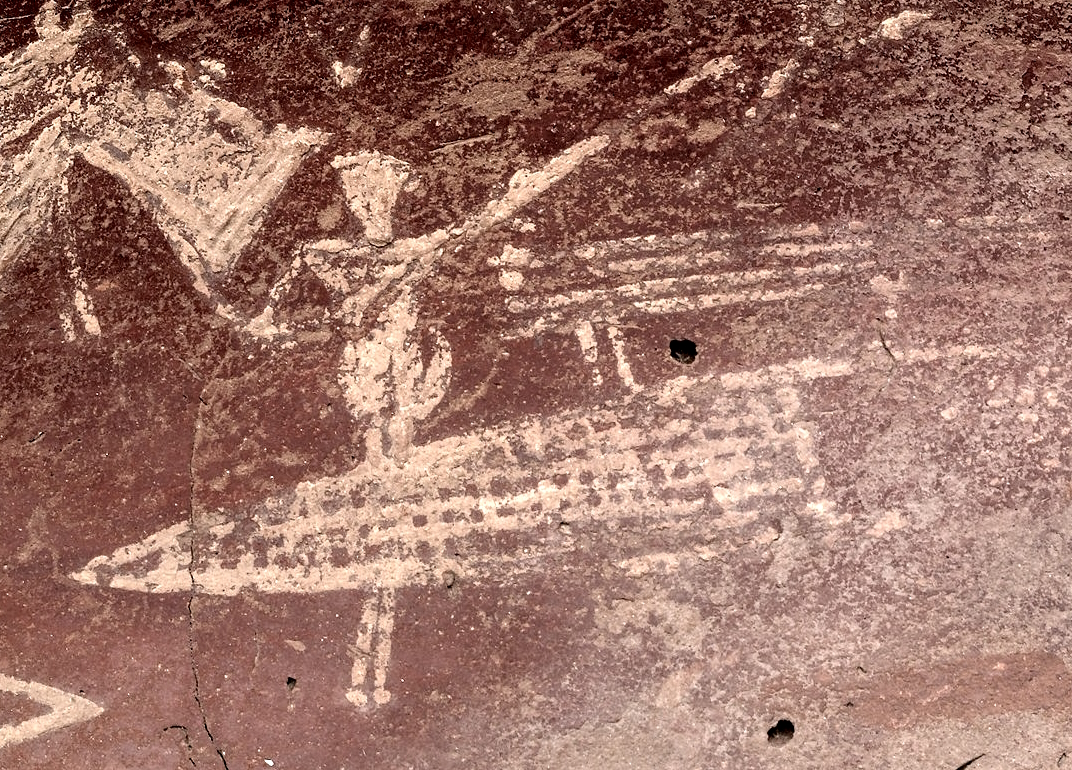
Man on a boat fishing. Naqada I, ca. 3700 BC.

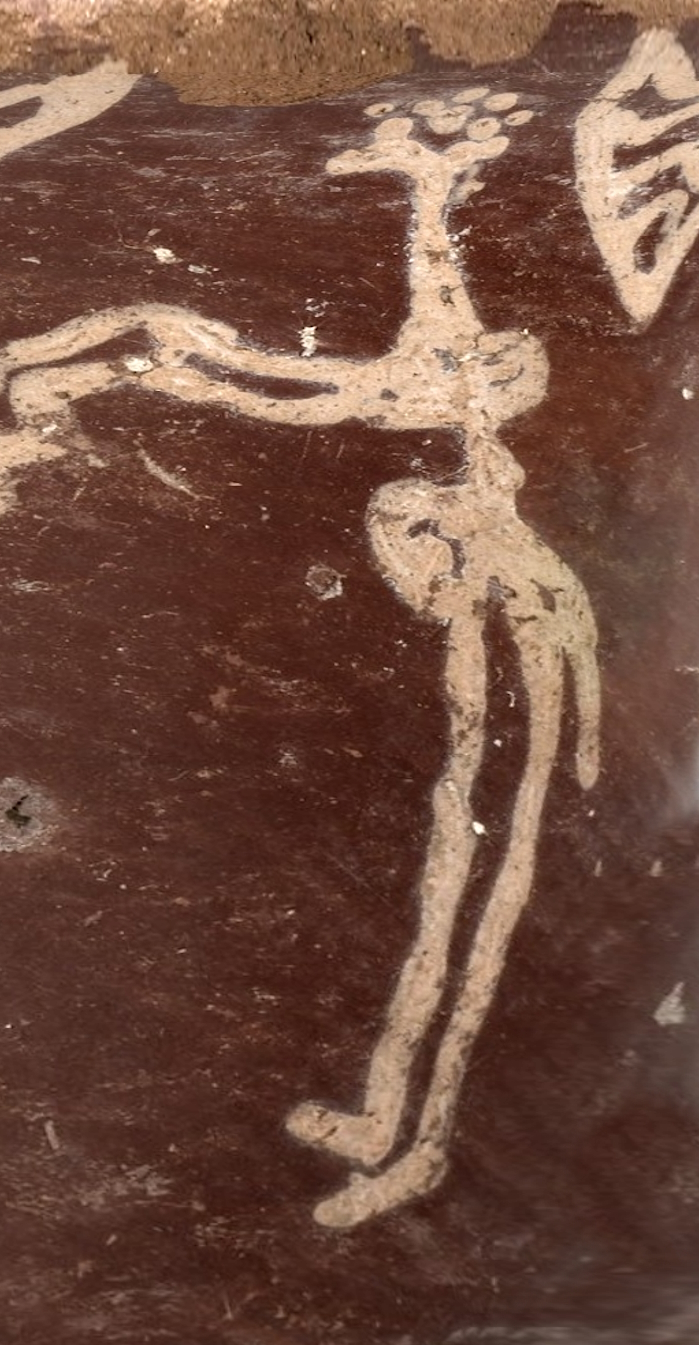
Hunter using a harpoon. Circa 3650–3500 BC. Late Naqada I–early Naqada II

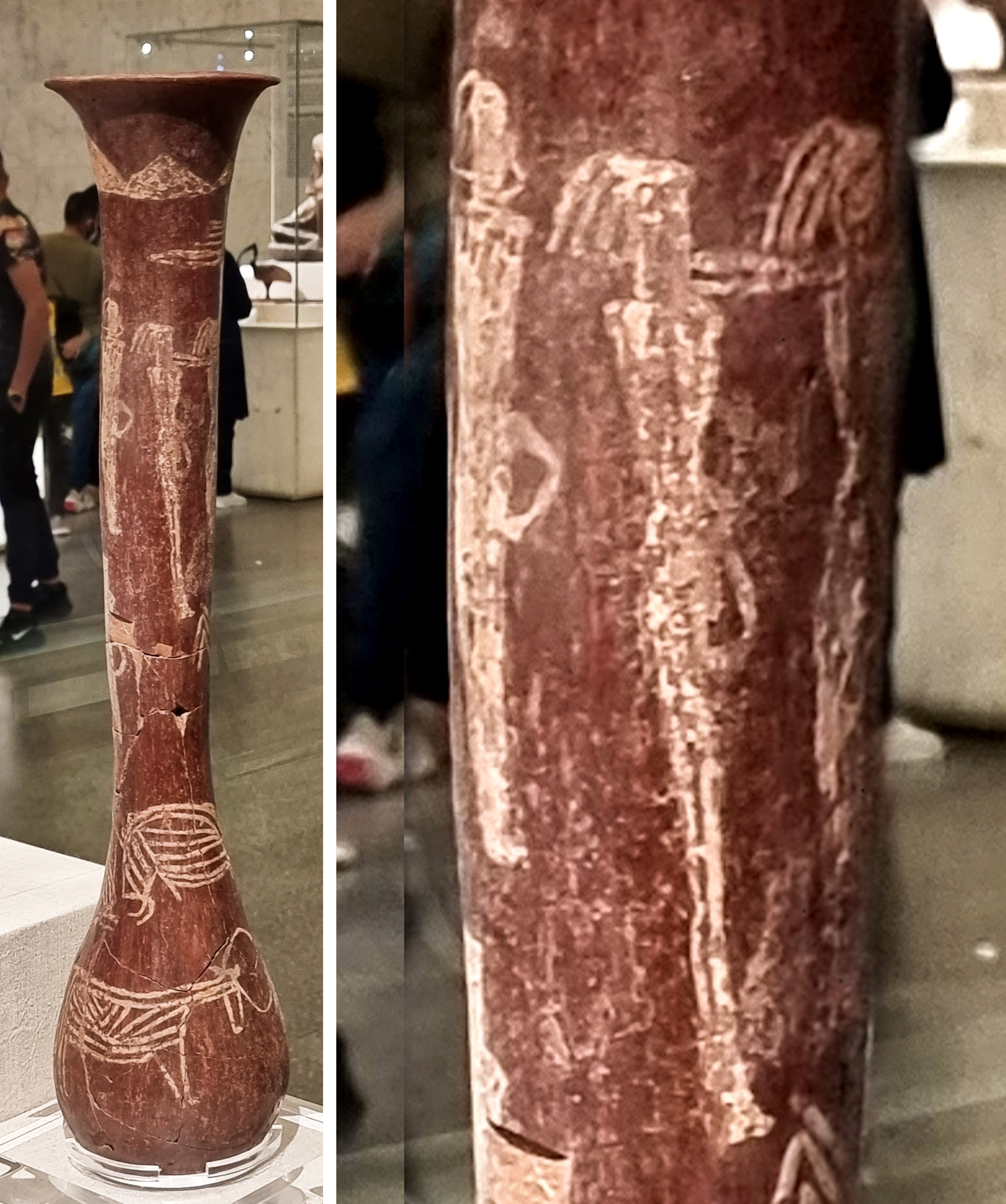
Prisoners scene, Abydos, U-415/1.

=== Burials ===
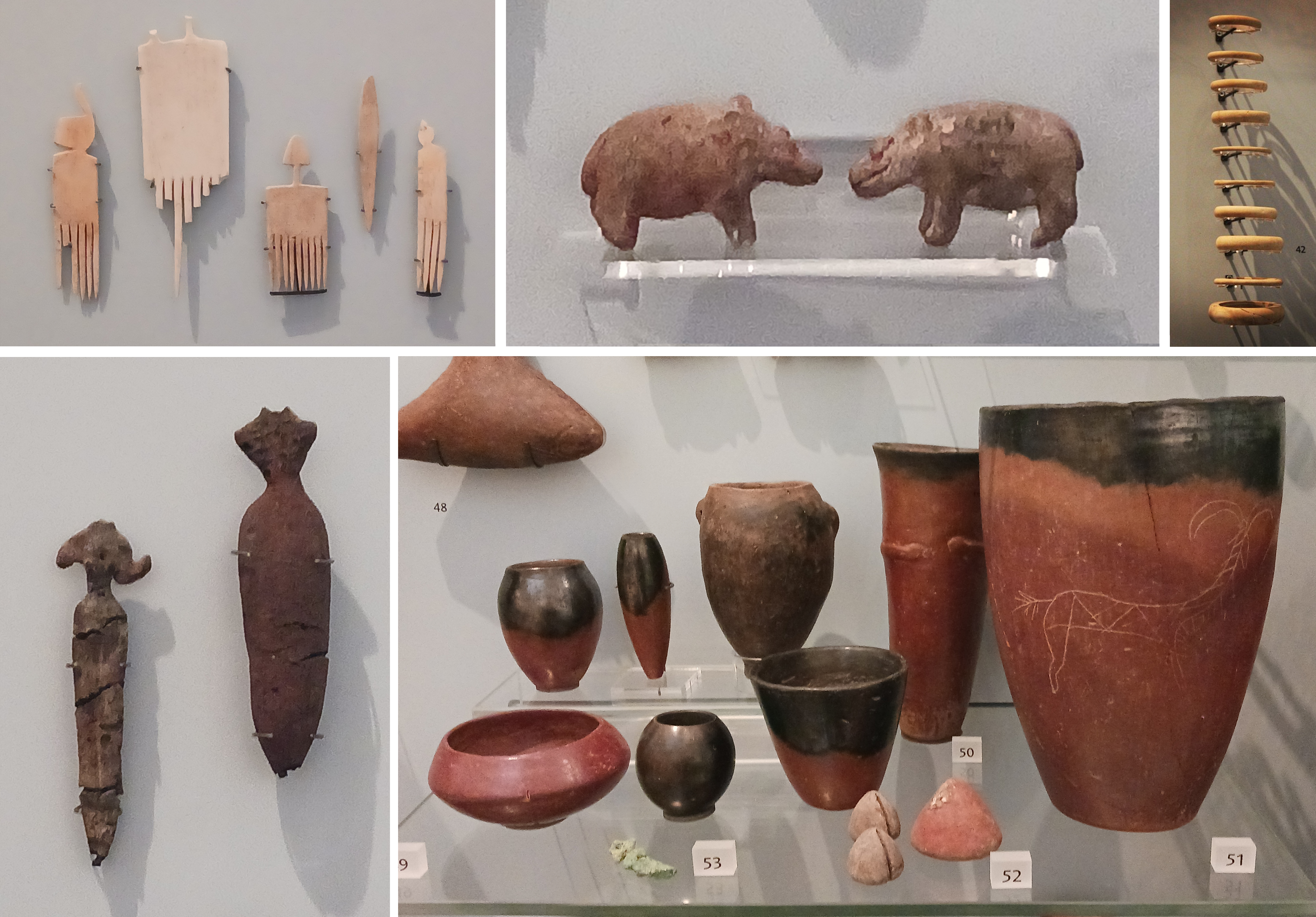
A Naqada IB-IC burial assemblage (SD 34), with ivory tags, female statuettes, animal depictions and a variety of pottery (Grave B101, Abadiya). Ashmolean Museum

The period of Naqada I sees the appearance of early forms of artifacts that would become characteristic of the later Naqada periods: ivory tags, simple statuettes.

In the area of pottery, black-topped red pottery was the main style, with some white cross-lined pottery ("C-ware") and red polished ware ("R-ware"). Rough pottery (type "R") also started to appear during this period.

Known Naqada I cemeteries occupy a rather limited geographical area and are essentially located in the area around Naqada, including the cemeteries of Matmar, Salmany, Naqada and Armant.

=== Commerce and crafts ===
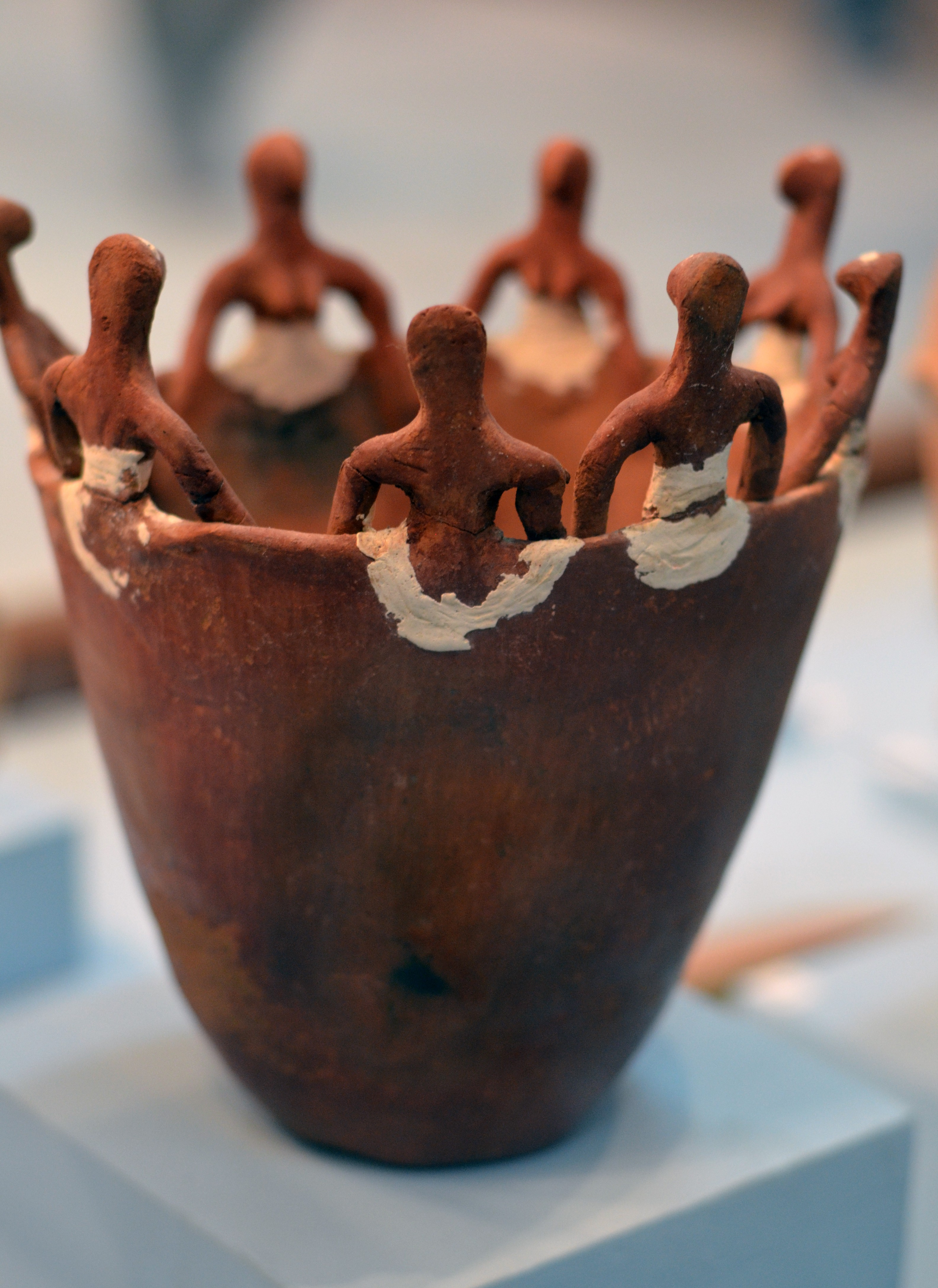
Vessel with "Dancing" Women. Predynastic Vessel. Naqada IC, circa 3700 BC, from the tomb U-502 at Umm el-Qaab, Abydos (Cairo Museum, JE 99583).

Trade between the Amratian culture bearers in Upper Egypt and populations of Lower Egypt is attested during this time through new excavated objects. A stone vase from the north has been found at el-Amrah. The predecessor Badarian culture had also discovered that malachite could be heated into copper beads; (Note: Copper may have also been imported from the Sinai Peninsula or perhaps Nubia.) the Amratians shaped this metal by chipping. Obsidian and a very small amount of gold were both imported from Nubia during this time. Trade with the oases also was likely. Cedar was imported from Byblos, marble from Paros, as well as emery from Naxos.

Innovations such as adobe buildings, for which the Gerzeh culture is well known, also begin to appear during this time, attesting to cultural continuity. However, they did not reach nearly the widespread use that they were known for in later times. Additionally, oval and theriomorphic cosmetic palettes appear to be used in this period. However, the workmanship was still very rudimentary and the relief artwork for which they were later known is not yet present.

Each Amratian village had an animal deity; amulets were worn of humans and various animals including birds and fish. Food, weaponry, statuettes, decorations, malachite, and occasionally dogs were buried with the deceased.

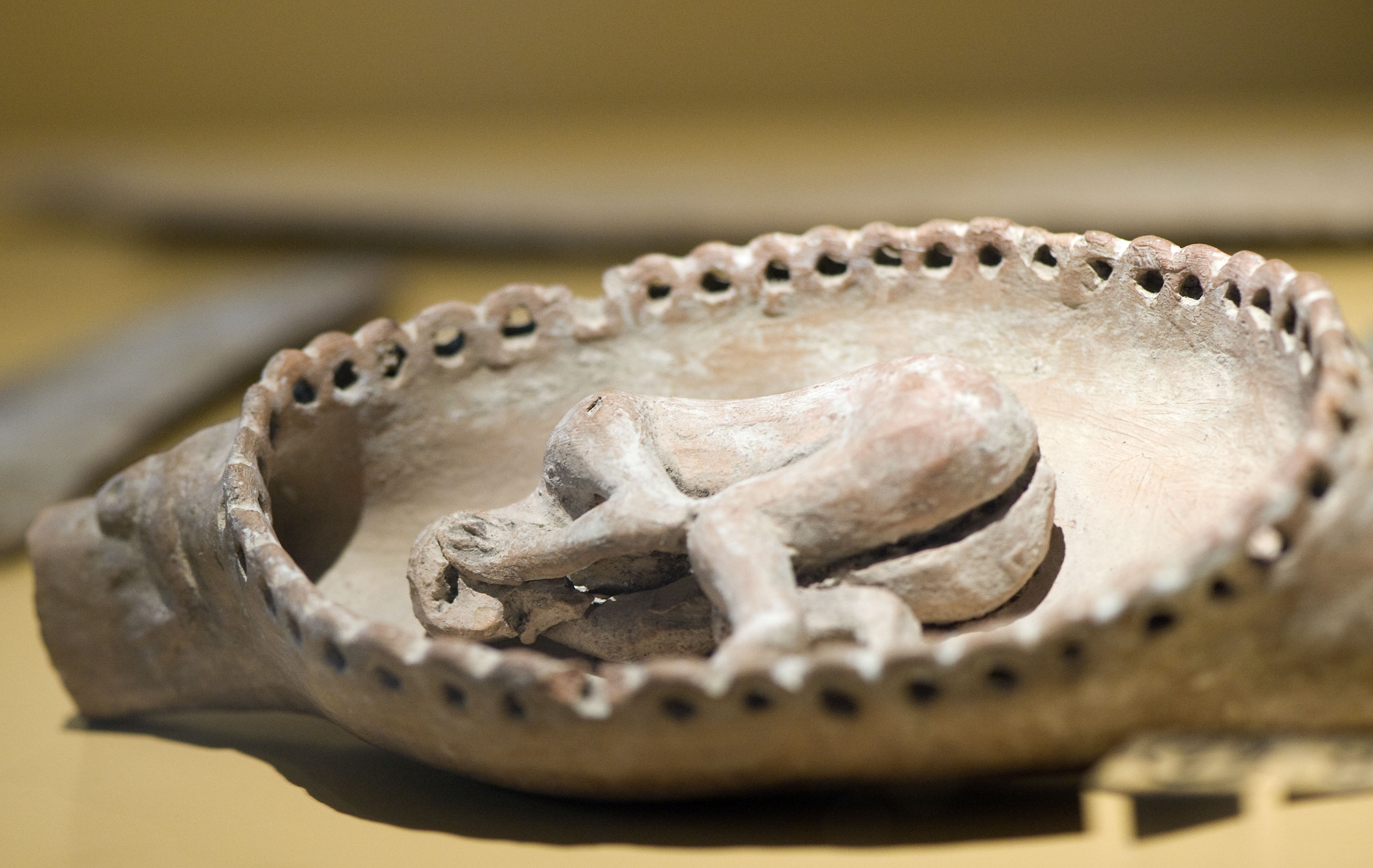
Clay figure, Egypt Naqada I period, circa 4000 BC. RMO Leiden

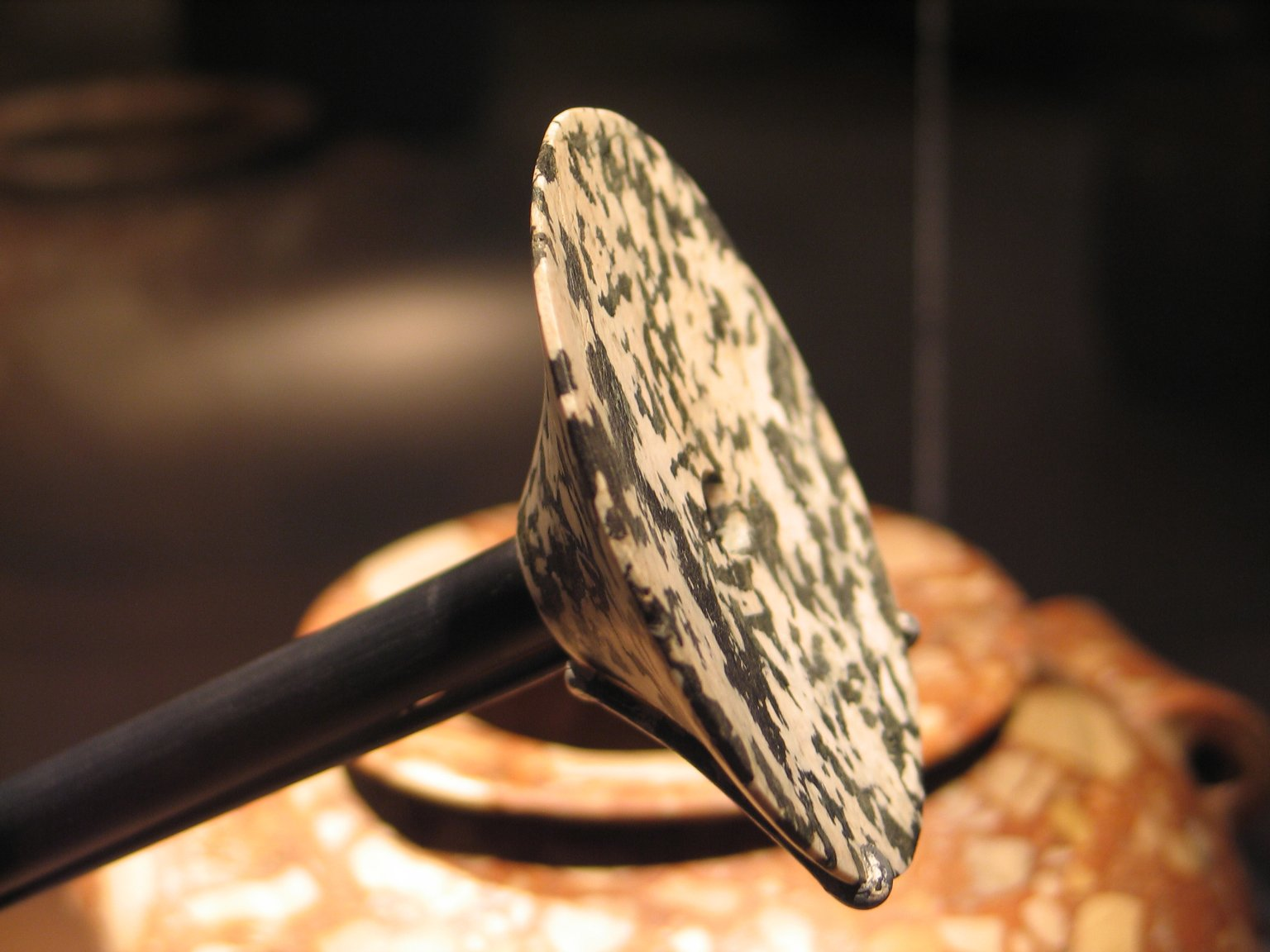
Egyptian disk-shaped macehead, 4000–3400 BCE. At the end of the period, it was replaced by the superior Mesopotamian-style pear-shaped macehead, as seen on the Narmer Palette.

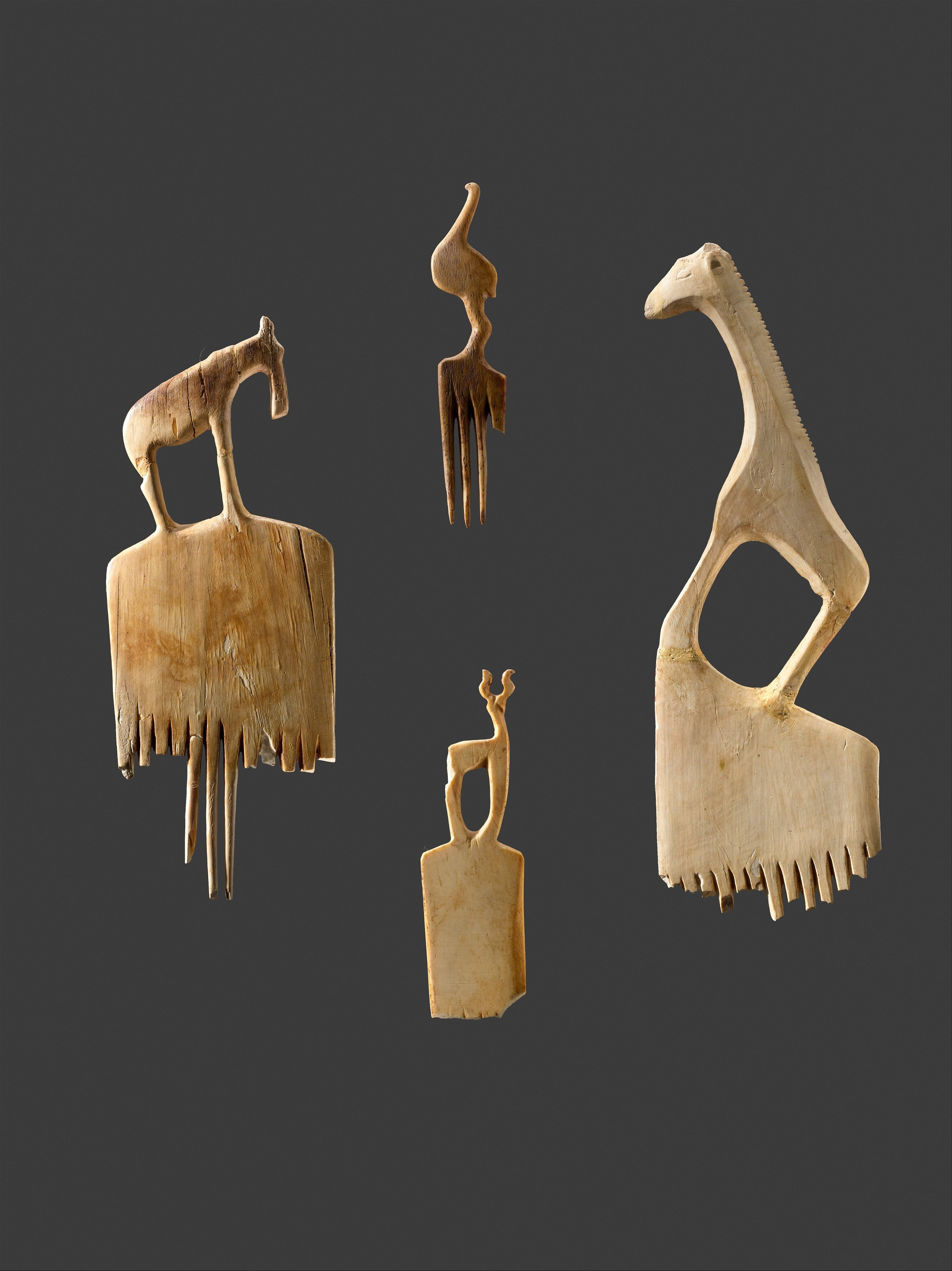
Decorated ivory combs. Late Naqada I-Naqada II, 3900-3500 BC

=== Early cosmetic palettes ===
Siltstone was first utilized for cosmetic palettes by the Badari culture. The first palettes used in the Badarian Period and in Naqada I were usually plain, rhomboidal or rectangular in shape, without any further decoration. It is in the Naqada II period in which the zoomorphic palette is most common.

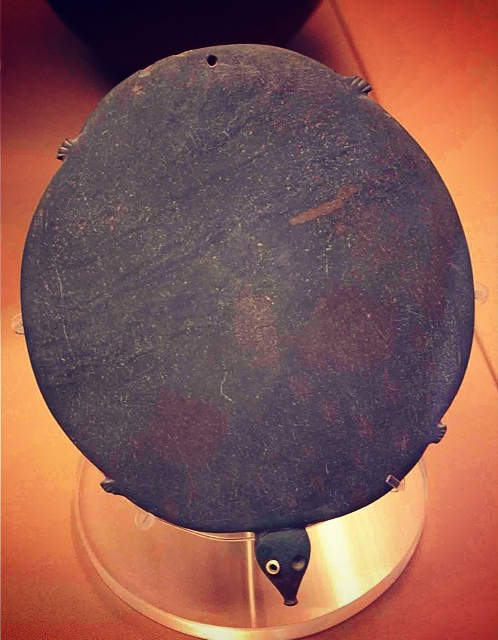
Mudstone cosmetic palette in the form of a turtle with inlaid bone eyes (one missing). Predynastic, Naqada I. 4000–3600 BC. EA 37913 (British Museum)

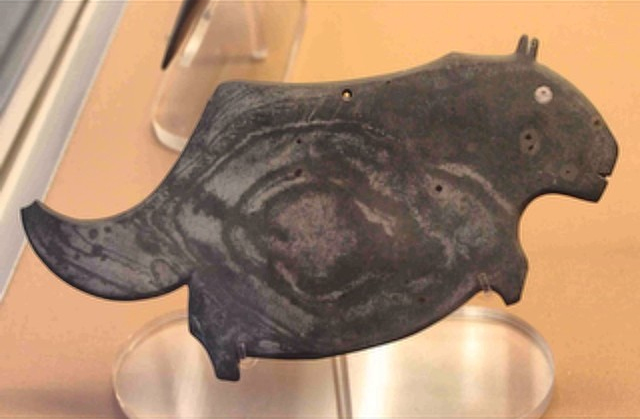
Mudstone palette in the form of a hippopotamus. Predynastic, Naqada I. 4000–3600 BC. EA 29416. (British Museum)

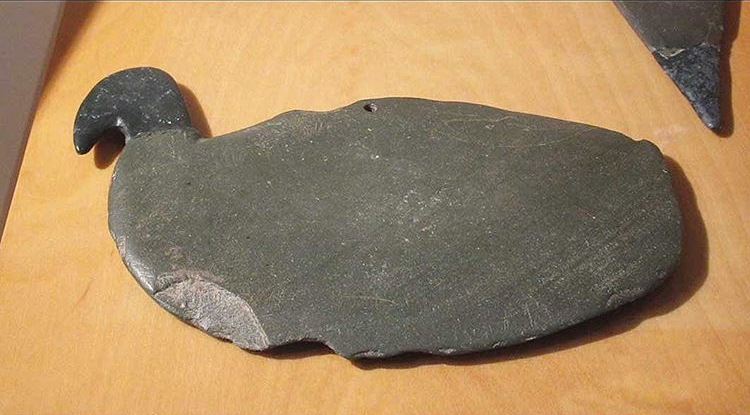
Naqada I–II palette for blending cosmetics

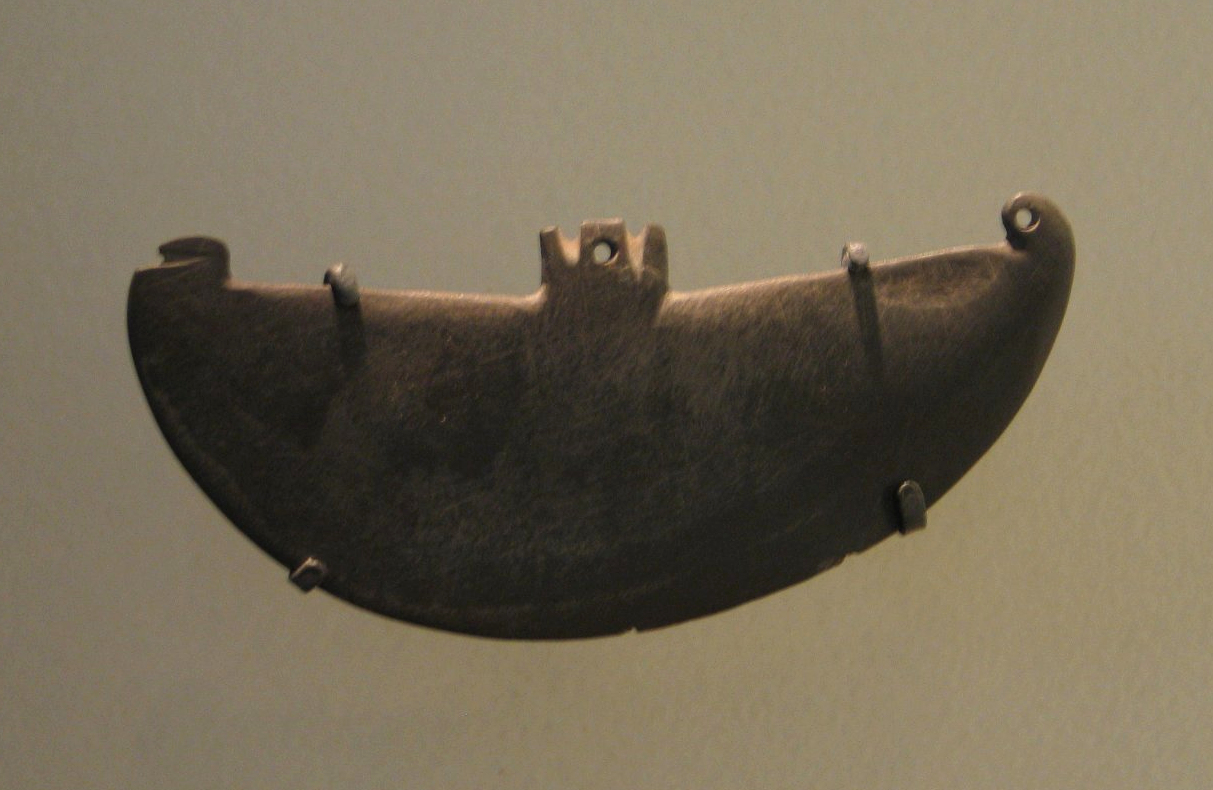
Palette in the shape of a boat, 3700–3600 BC, Naqada I

=== Stoneware ===
Various example of basaltic polished stoneware, sometimes called "Black Polished Ware", are known from the Naqada I period, particularly from the area of Abydos.

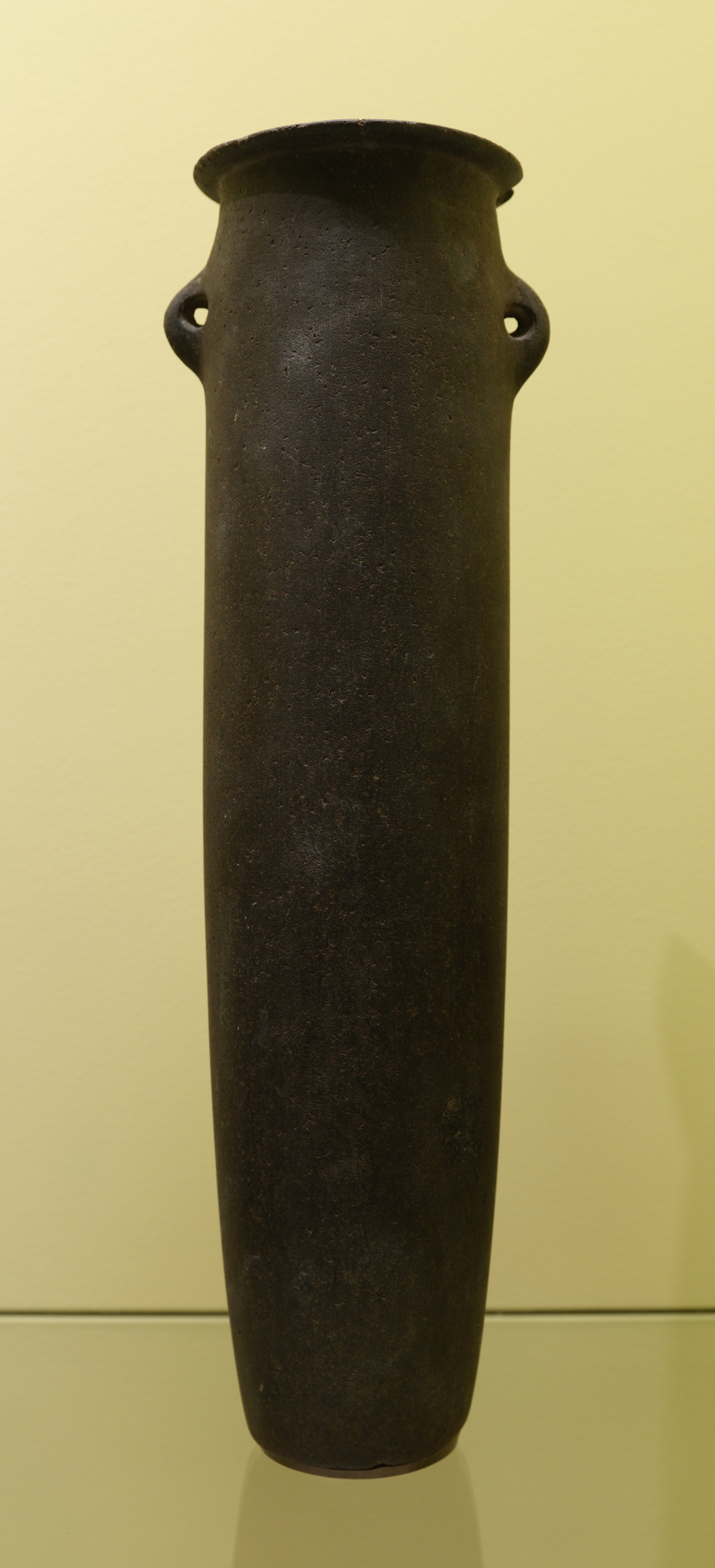
Naqada I basalt vessel. Louvre Museum.

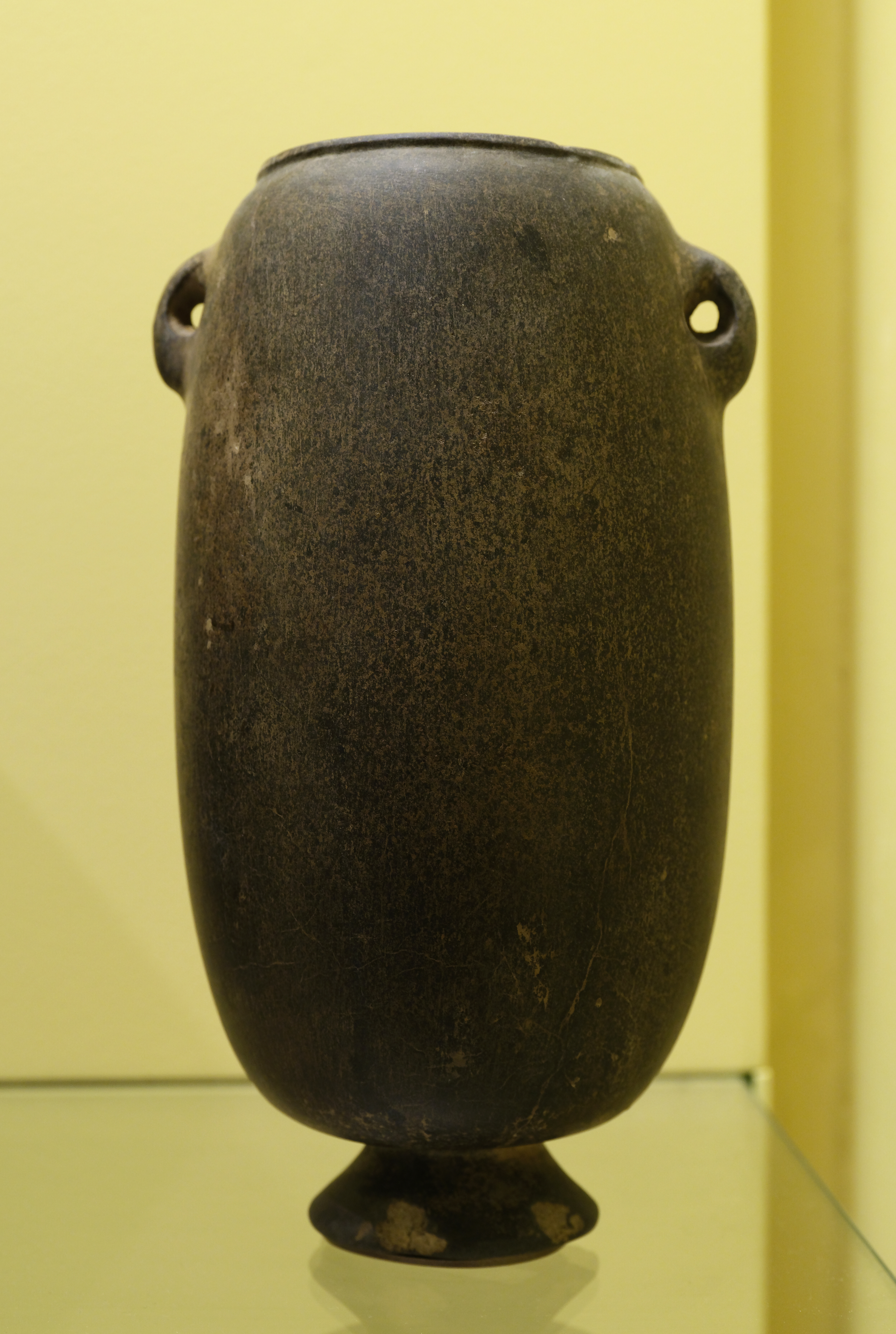
Naqada I basalt vessel. Louvre Museum

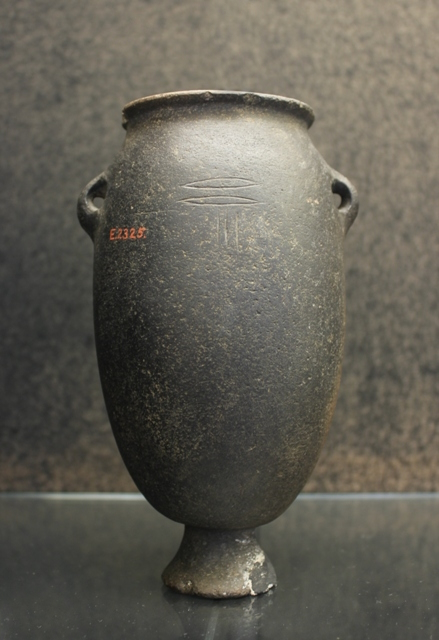
Basalt vessel with inscription, Naqada I

=== Penile sheathes ===
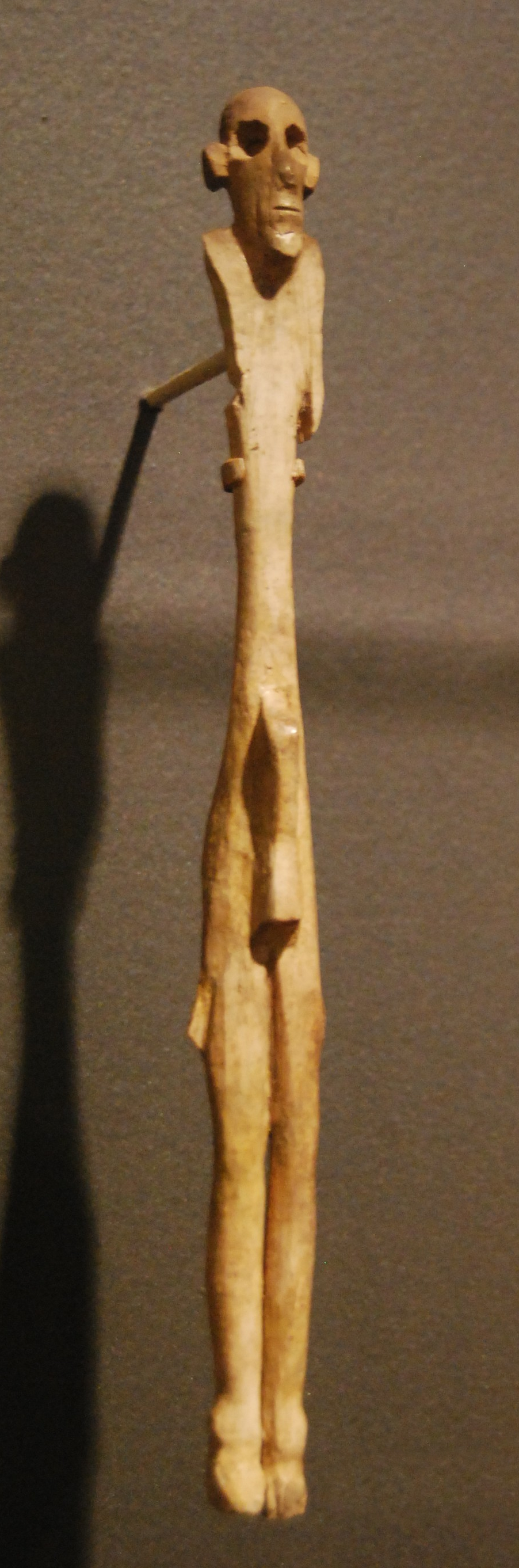
Figure of a man, Naqada I, 3800-3650. Brooklyn Museum.

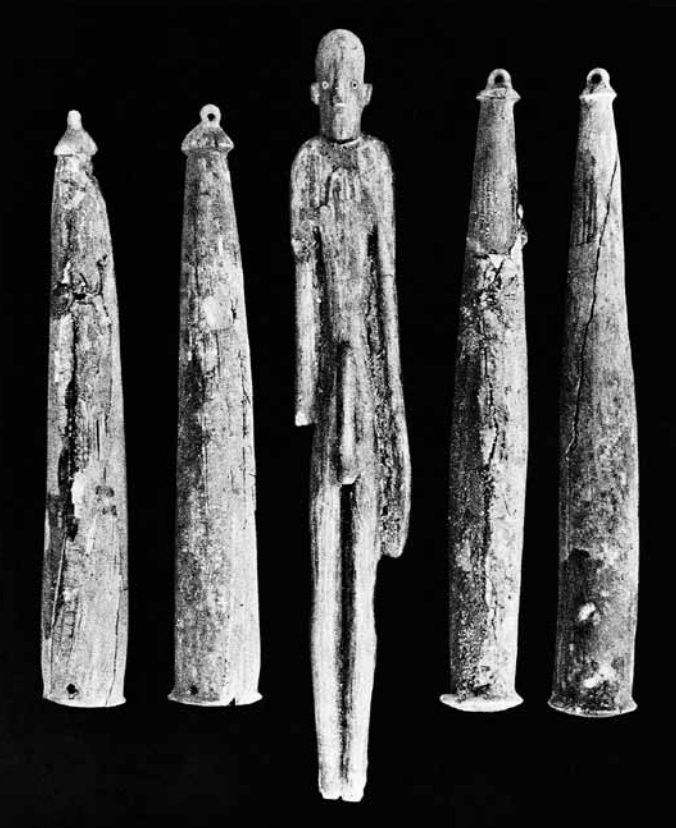
Statuette of a man with penile sheath, and various ivory tusks. Tomb H29, El Mahasna. Naqada I (c.3900-3600 BC).

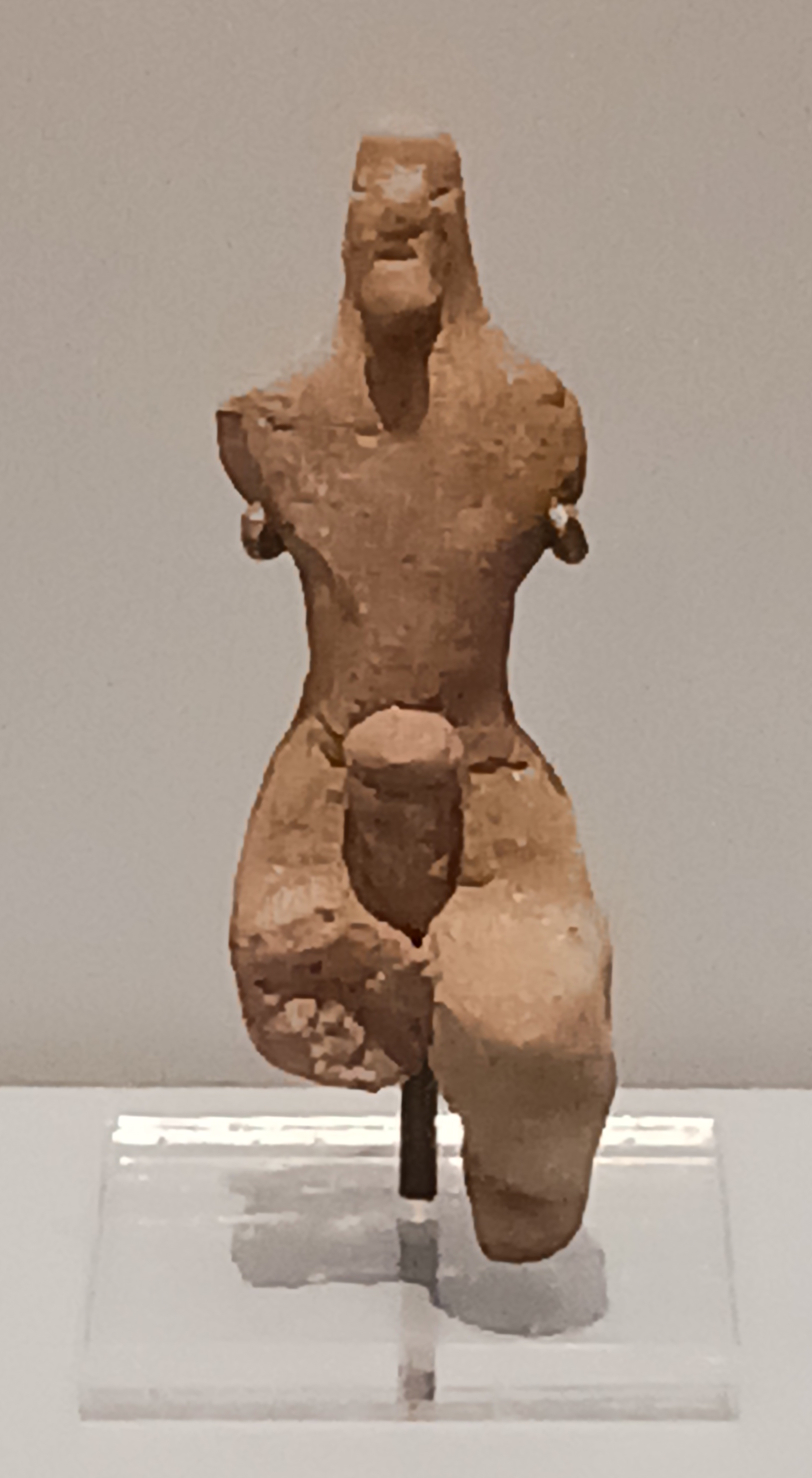
Seated man with penis sheath. Naqada I. Abadiya, grave B119. Ashmolean Museum.

Numerous male statuettes from the Naqada I-III period are shown displaying penile sheaths, a characteristic attribute of many hunter-gatherer societies. Such depictions appear in Hierakonpolis, Abydos, on the Gebel el-Arak Knife, or on the golden statuettes of Tell el-Farkha. They were held in place by leather strings tied at the waist, and possible at the bottom as well.

It has been suggested that many of the decorated hippopotamus tusks also found in tombs of the period may be the very penile sheaths depicted in these statuettes, or at least symbolic representations of them. Penile sheath (karnatiw) may also have been used for medical reasons, in a mistaken attempt to avoid schistosomiasis and contamination by cercariae.

Rather similar figures, using similar ivory material, also appear in the contemporary archaeology of the Levant Chalcolithic (4500-3500 BC), suggesting a level of trade relations and cultural influence from Egypt at that time.

=== Female statuettes ===
Various female statuettes from Naqada I have been found, mainly made of ivory and bone. A few broadly similar ivory statuettes are already known from the preceding Badarian period.

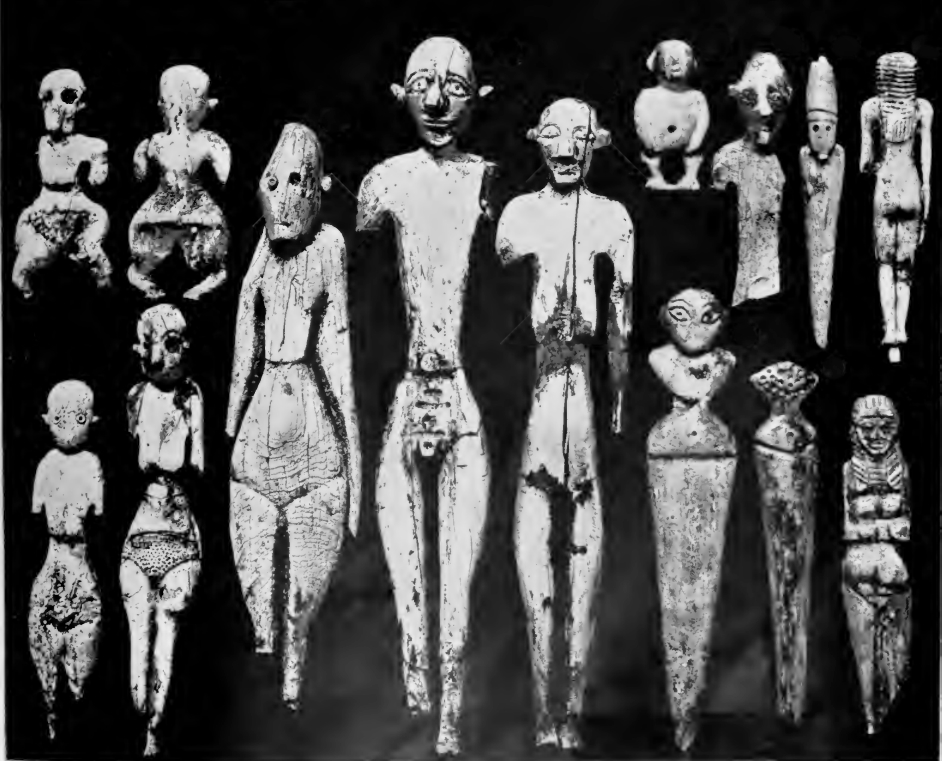
Early Naqada I statuettes. Petrie dated these statuettes to SD 31-34.

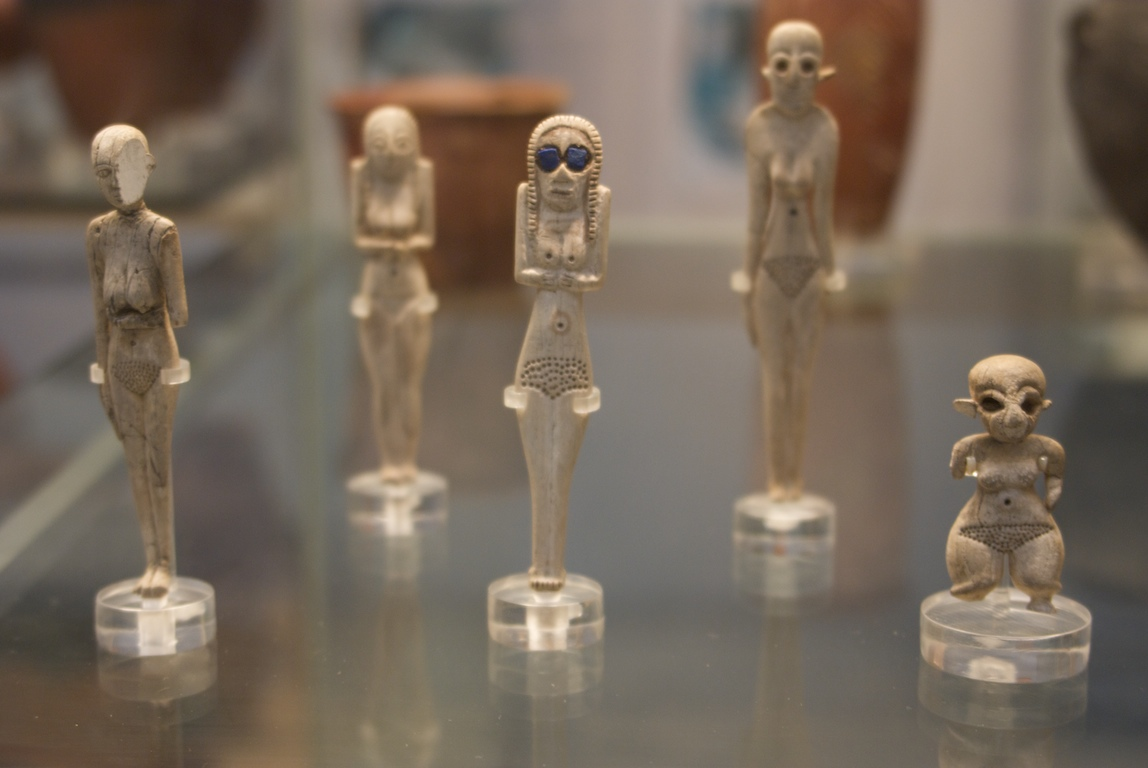
Figurines of bone and ivory. Naqada I. 4000–3600 BC.

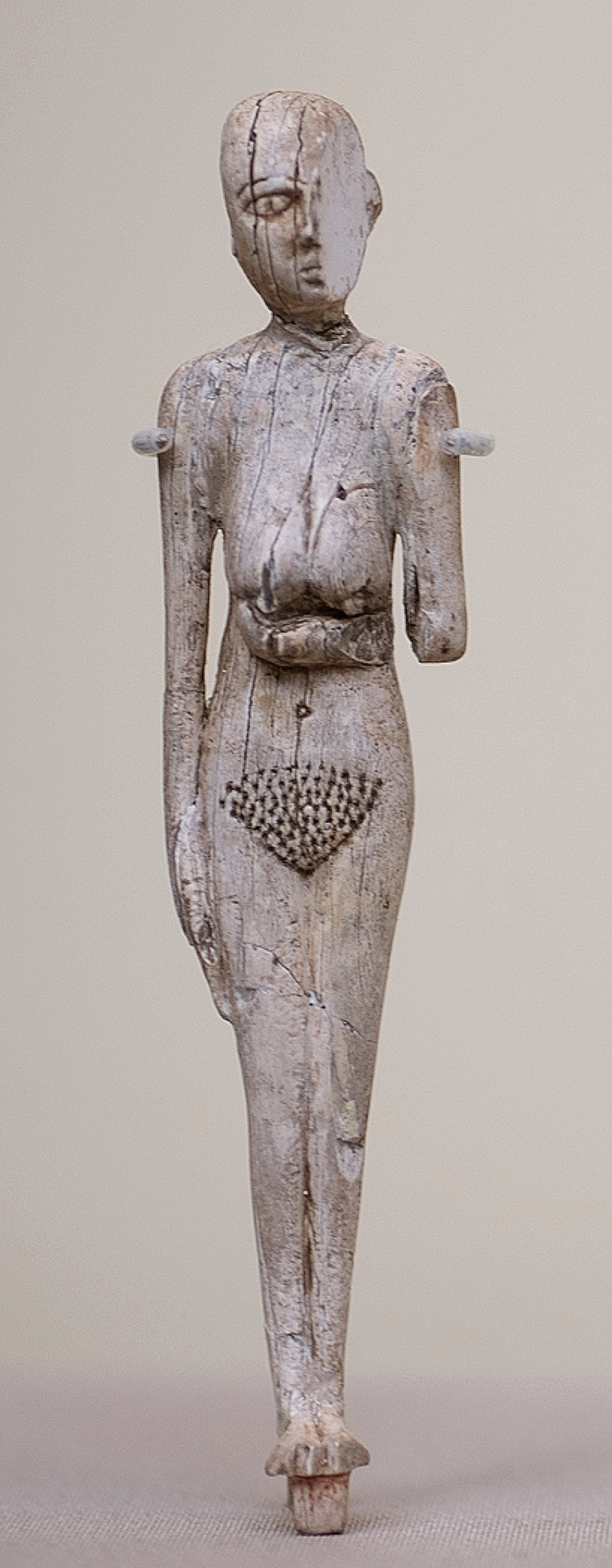
Female statuette, Naqada IC. Alternatively dated Naqada II-III.

=== Bearded figures ===
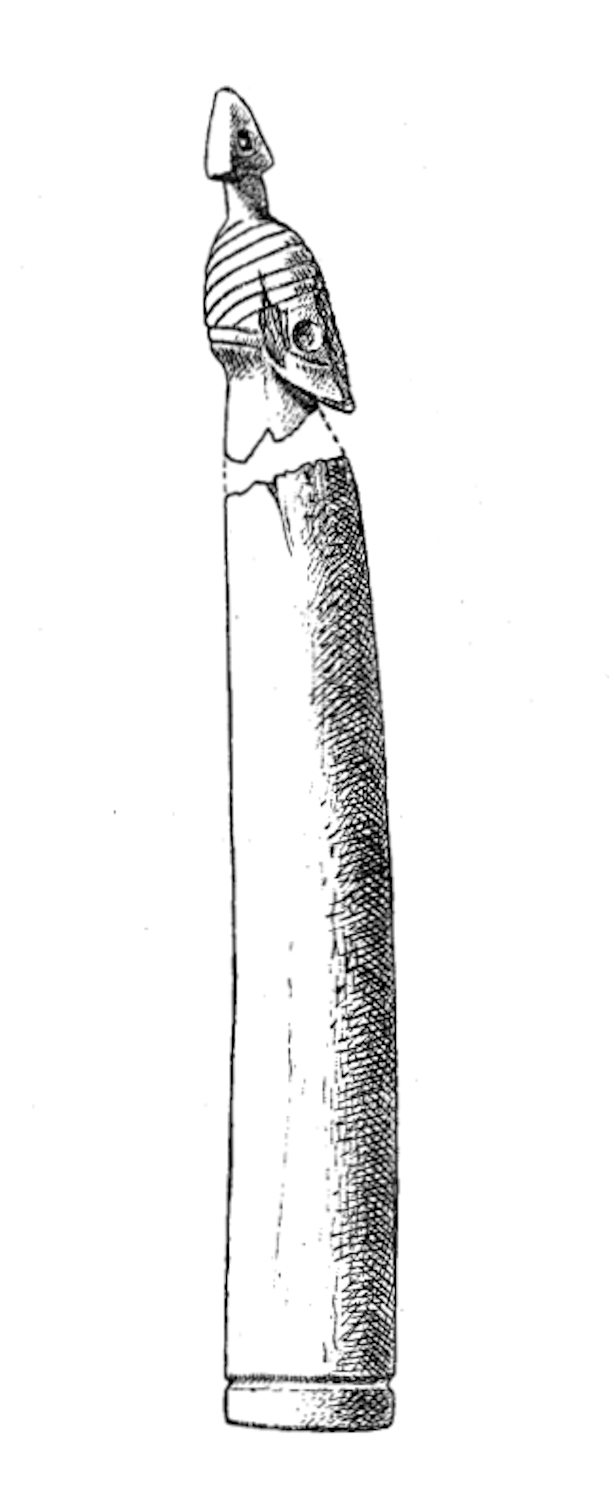
Ivory tusk with bearded figure, Badari tomb 3165, dated SD 37-38 (Naqada IC-Naqada IIA).

Tall bearded figures with hats seem to appear towards the end of the Naqada I period, specifically during Naqada IC. Many such figurines have pointed beards, and some trace of hair. There are often indications of clothing, and they may represent people dressed in long cloaks. Bearded men also appear in many other pre-dynastic artifacts, such as the Gebel el-Arak Knife. The headgear of the Mesopotamian-style "Lord of Animals" on the Gebel el-Arak knife may also be comparable to the torus-shaped headgear visible on many of the Naqada I figurines.

The depiction of the hat is often considered as a possible predecessor and one of the earliest representation of the Egyptian White Crown: "Together this knob-like element together with the elongated form of the head are striking in their resemblance to the tapering bulb-shape of the later White Crown."

Many anthropomorphic ivory tags showing bearded individuals were found in Naqada graves dated to the Naqada IC-IIA period, with only a few specimens in Naqada IIB. These have been found in the same graves as anthropomorphic tusk and simple animal ivory tags, indicating contemporaneity between these objects.

A bearded figure atop an ivory tusk was excavated from Badari tomb 3165 and dated SD 37-38, at the intermediate period between Naqada IC and Naqada IIA. This is one of the rare such figurines to have been excavated in a secure archaeological excavation, making it pivotal in determining their antiquity.

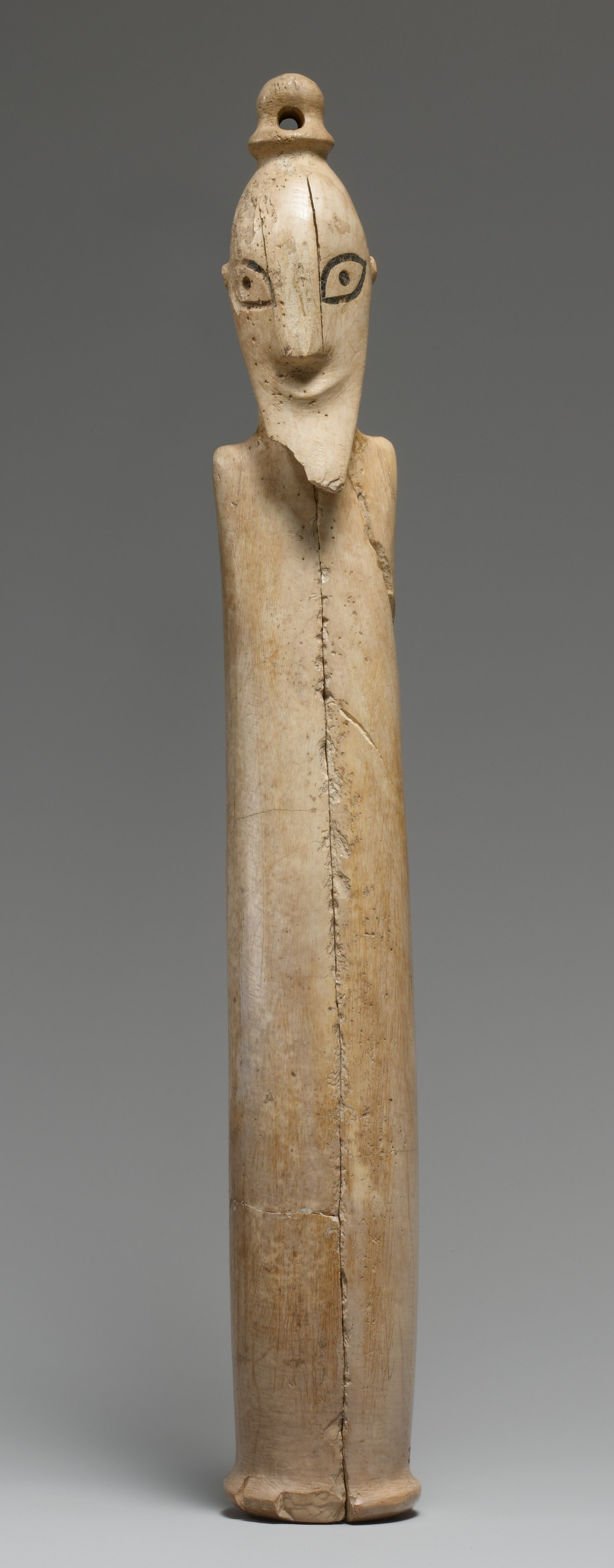
Tusk figurine of a man Late Naqada I to Early Naqada II, 3900-3500 BCE

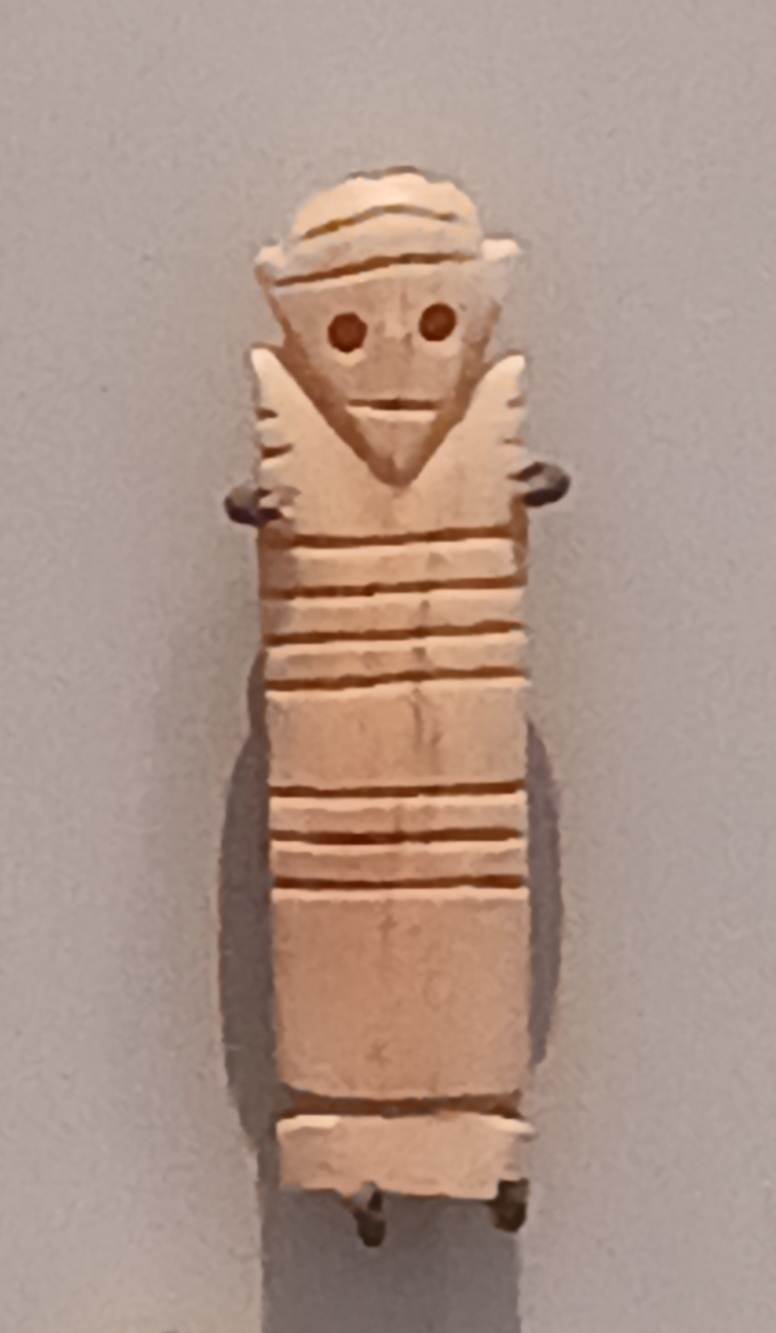
Anthropomorphic tag. Matmar grave 2682. Naqada IC

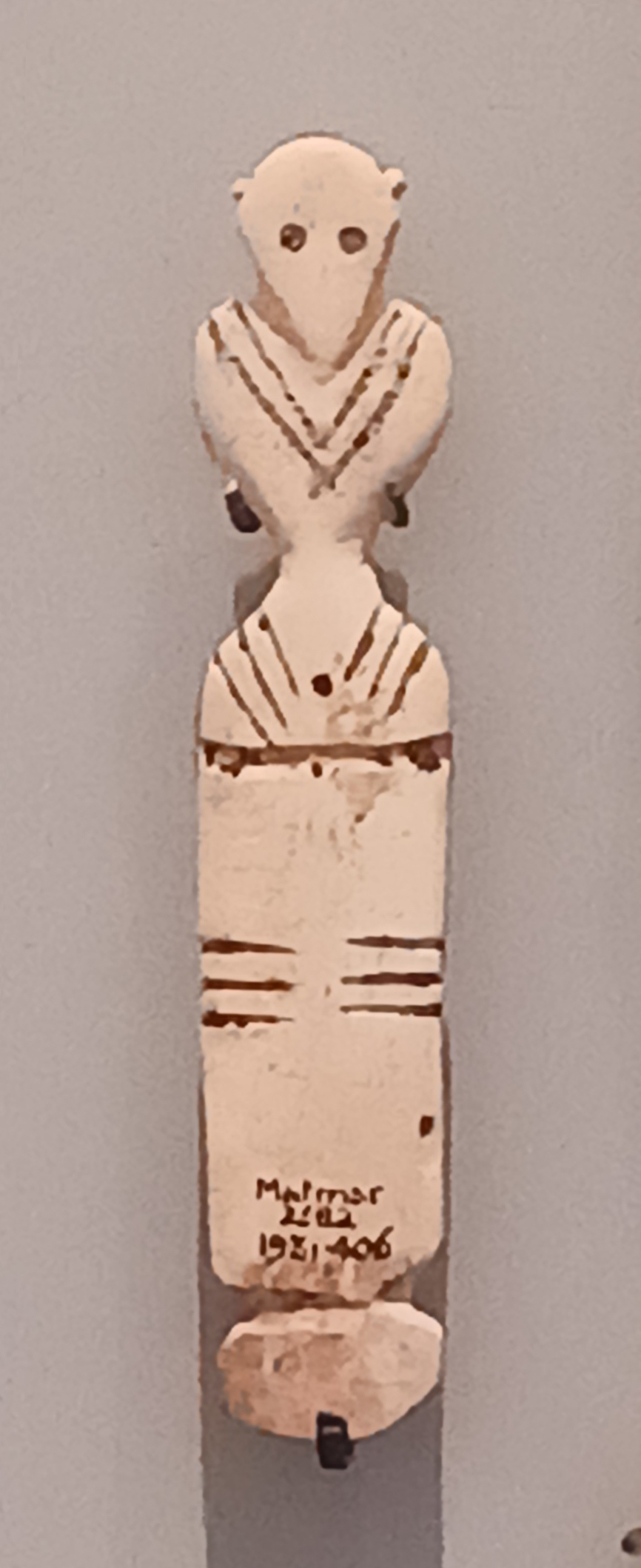
Ivory human figures, Matmar grave 2682. Naqada IC.

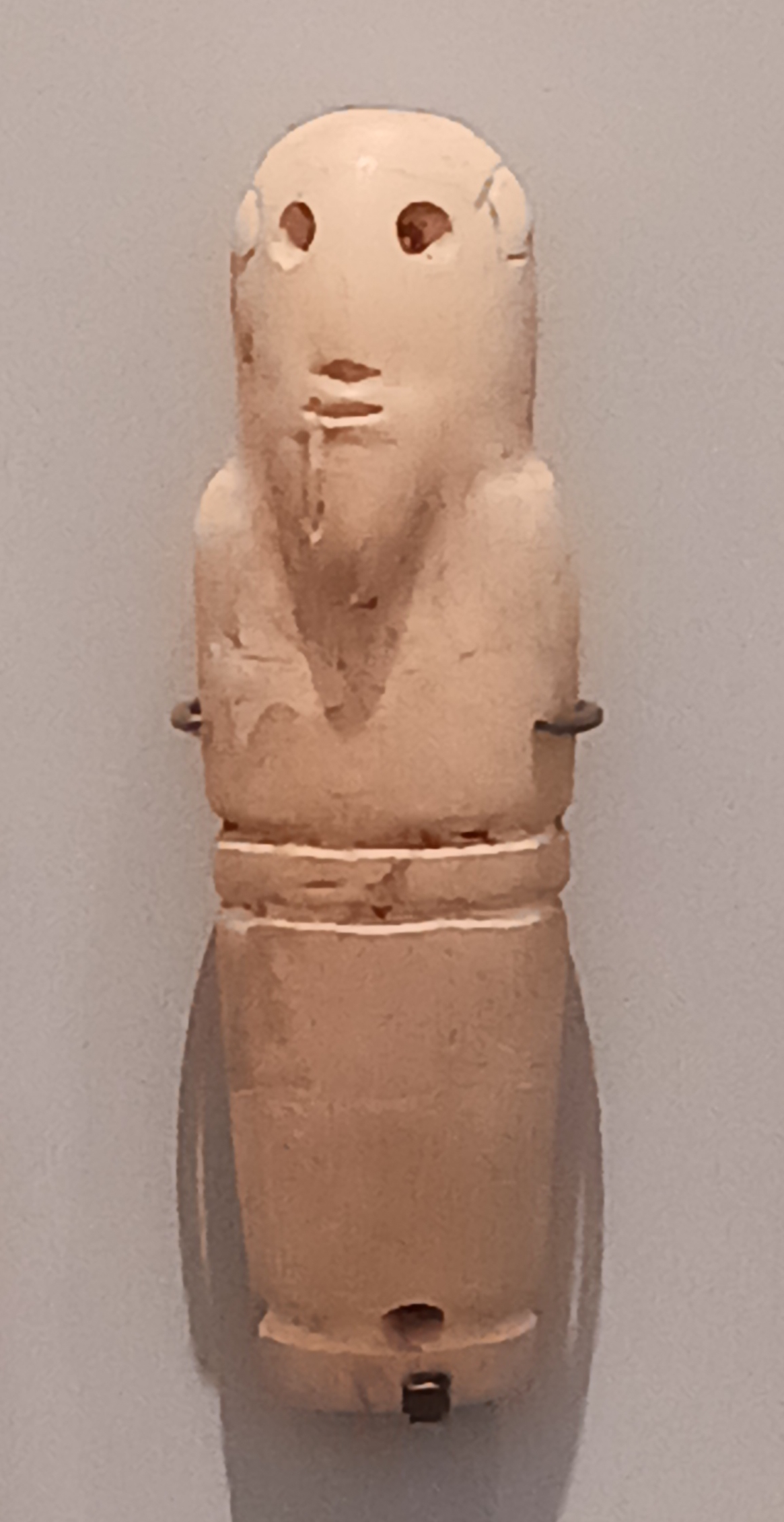
Naqada, Tomb 1329, transitional Naqada I-II.

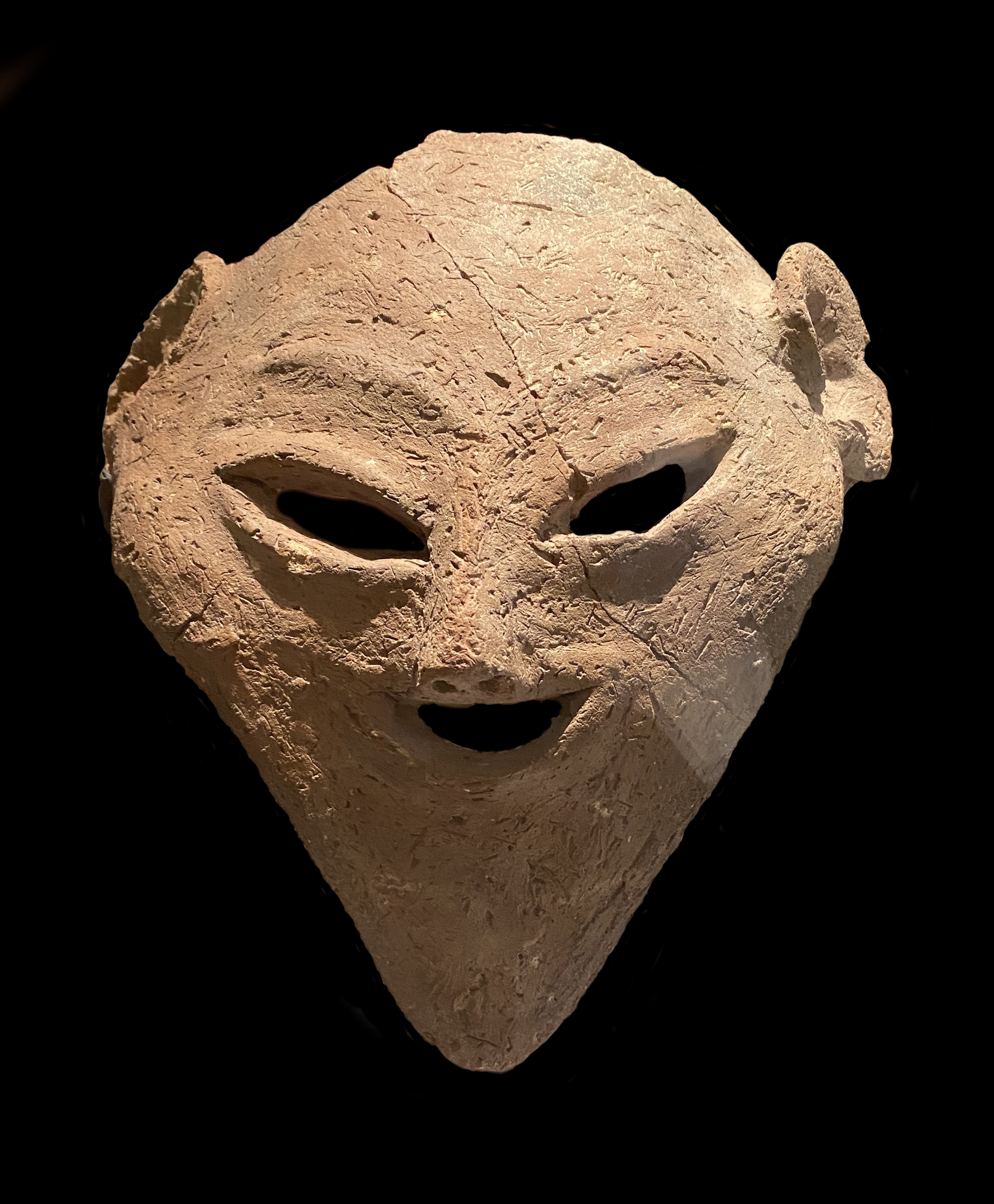
Death mask. Naqada IC–IIA (3750 BC). Hierakonpolis elite cemetery (HK6, Tomb 16).

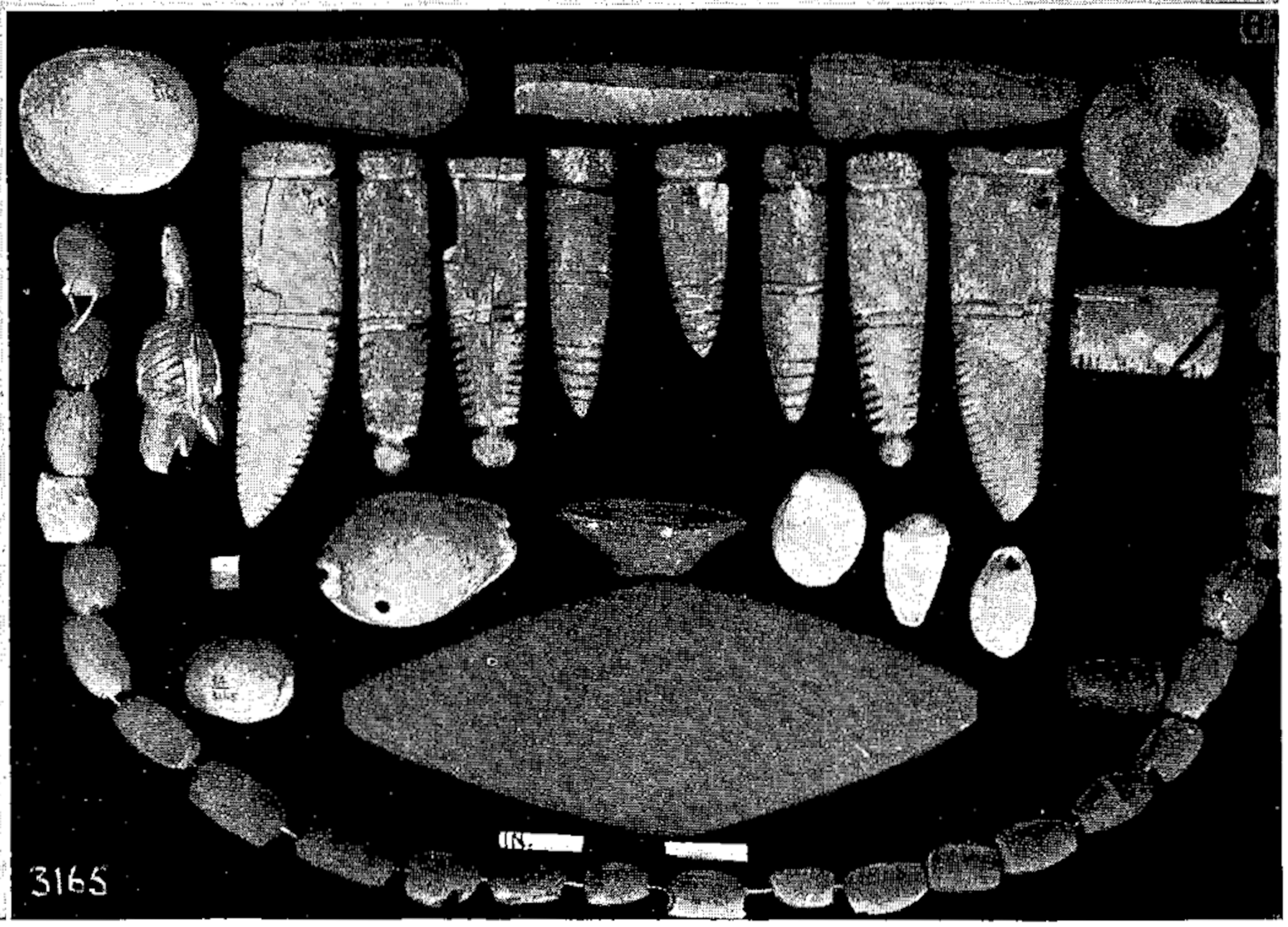
Inventory of Badari tomb 3165, dated SD 37-38 (Naqada IC-Naqada IIA)

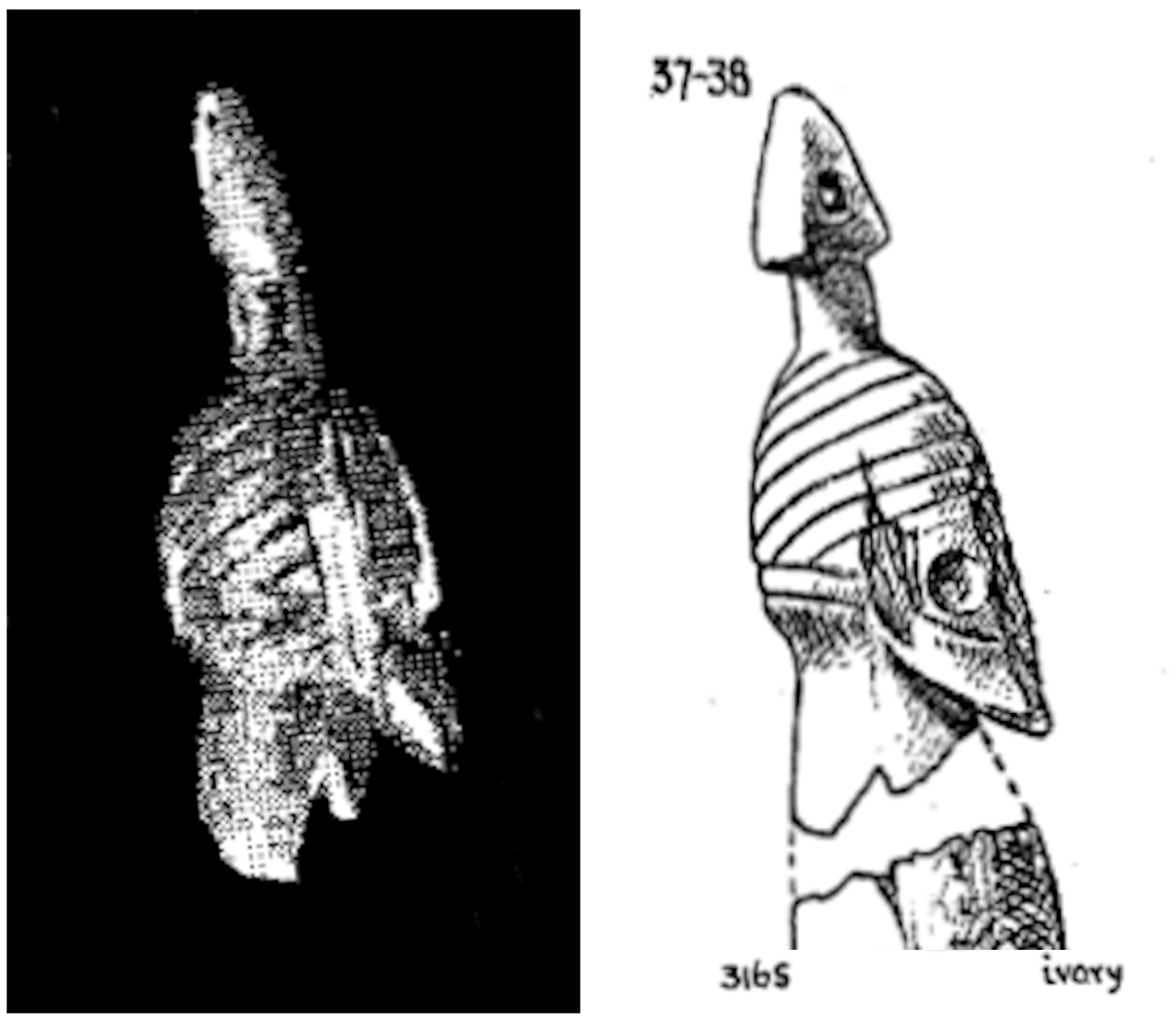
Ivory tusk figurine of Badari tomb 3165, dated SD 37-38 (Naqada IC-Naqada IIA)

== See also ==
- 5.9 kiloyear event
- Prehistoric Egypt
  - Naqada culture
    - Naqada III

== Archaeological reports ==
- Petrie, W. M. Flinders (William Matthew Flinders); Quibell, James Edward (1896). Naqada and Ballas. 1895. London, B. Quaritch.

== Sources ==
- Patch, Diana Craig; Eaton-Krauss, Marianne (2011). Dawn of Egyptian art. New York : New Haven: Metropolitan Museum of Art; Distributed by Yale University Press. ISBN 978-0300179521.
