= Black-topped pottery =

Type of Prehistoric Egyptian pottery

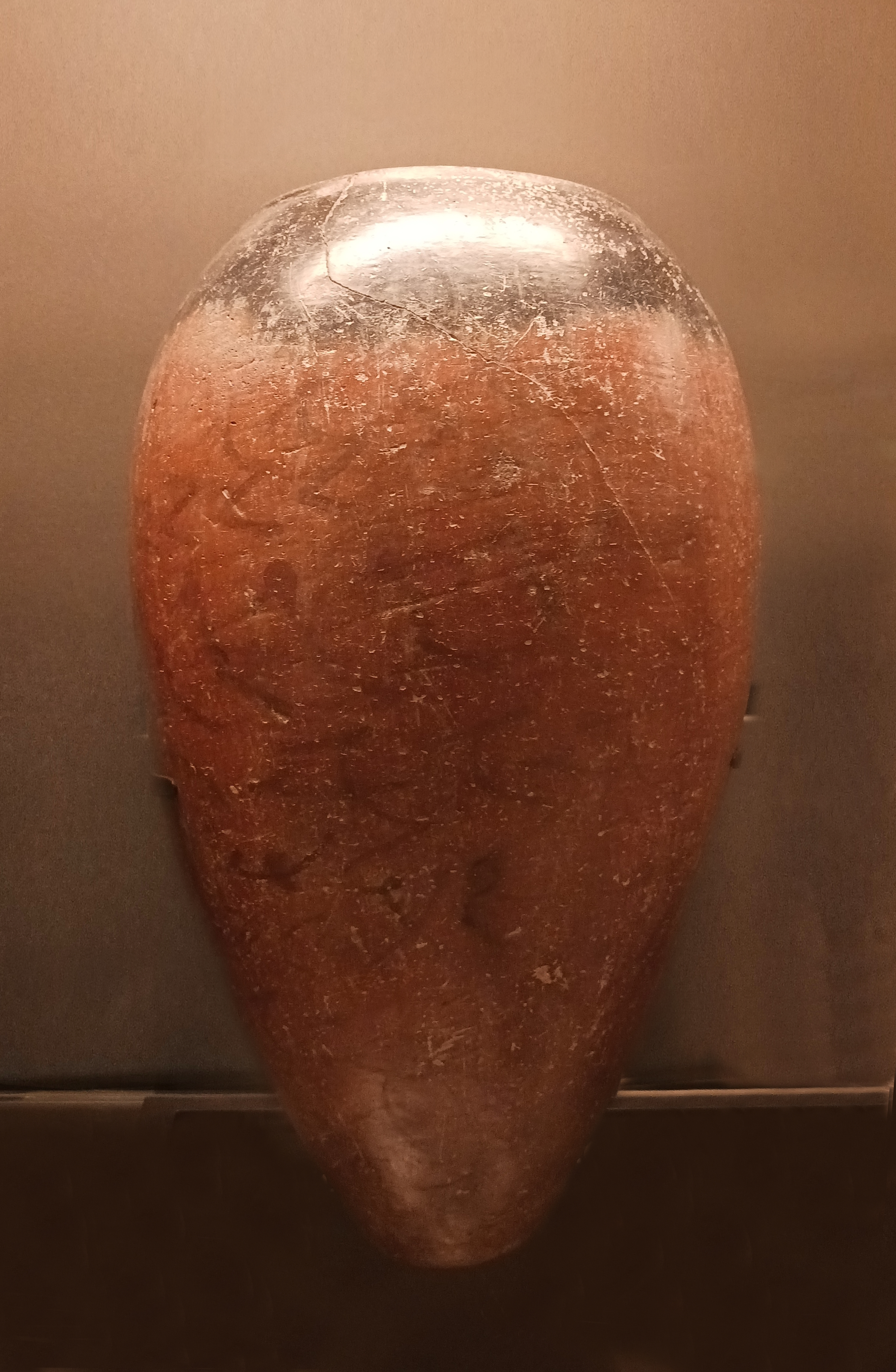
Black-top red ware. Naqada I to first half of Naqada II. 3800-3400 BCE. Louvre Museum

Black-topped pottery is a specialized type of Ancient Egyptian pottery that became the main pottery of the Egyptian Badarian culture, down to Naqada I and the middle of the Naqada II culture. The oldest finds are from Nubian archaeological sites, including Elephantine, an island on the Nile River, Nabta Playa in the Nubian Desert, and Kerma in present-day Sudan. This type of artifact dates predominantly to the Predynastic Period, but “a handful of examples made in the Early Dynastic Period are known to exist.” These vessels were used “exclusively for ritual and funerary purposes” and were discovered in ancient cemeteries and settlements. The majority of these pots are variations of the Egyptian hes-jar form and feature red bodies with black tops and interiors. The red color is derived from the natural iron that occurs within Nile silts which oxidizes upon firing, and the black top and interior is a product of reduction firing and carbon smudging.

== Archaeological chronology ==
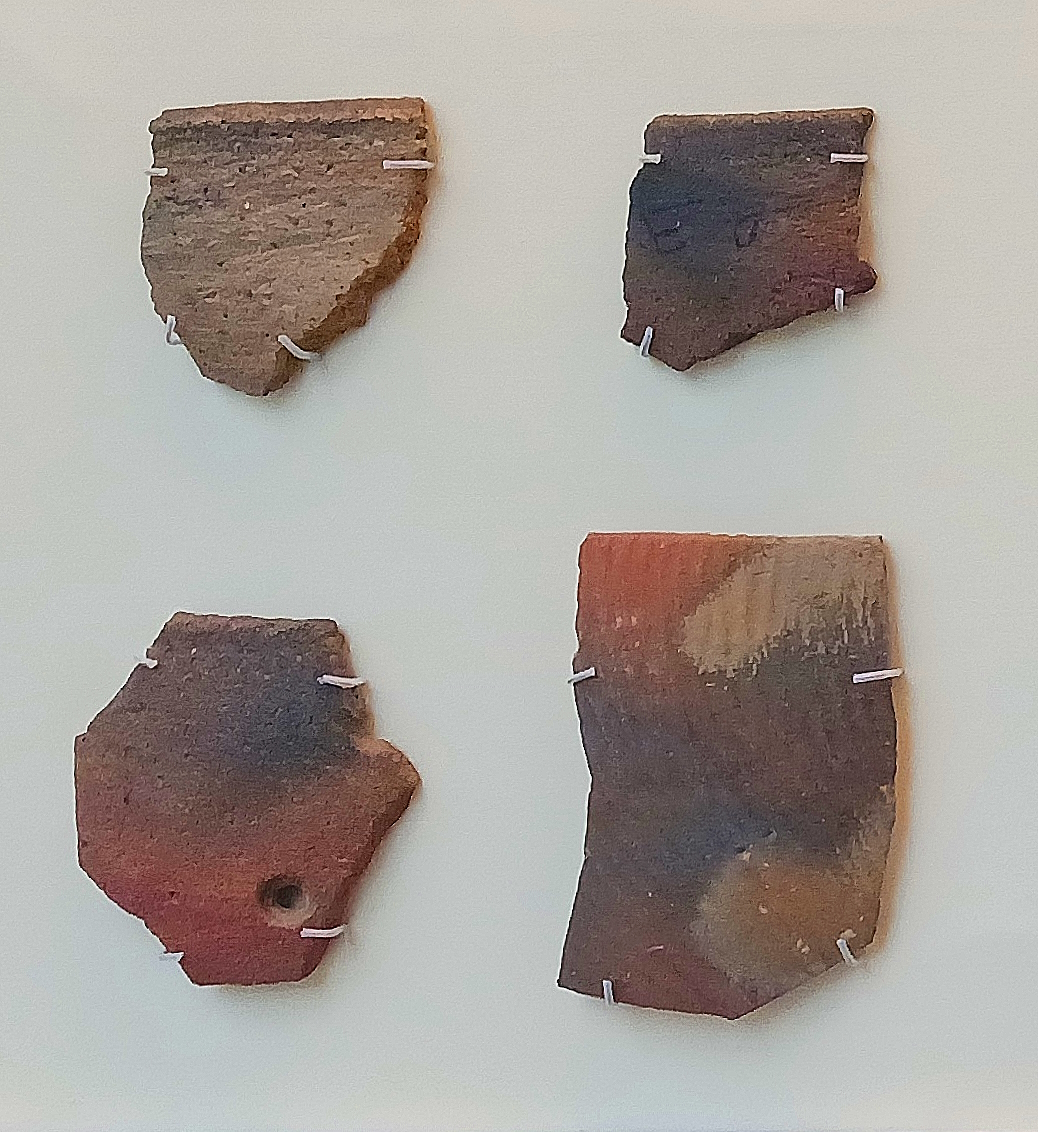
Fragments including black-rimmed pottery, Nabta Playa. Late Neolithic, 5400-4400 BCE. British Museum.

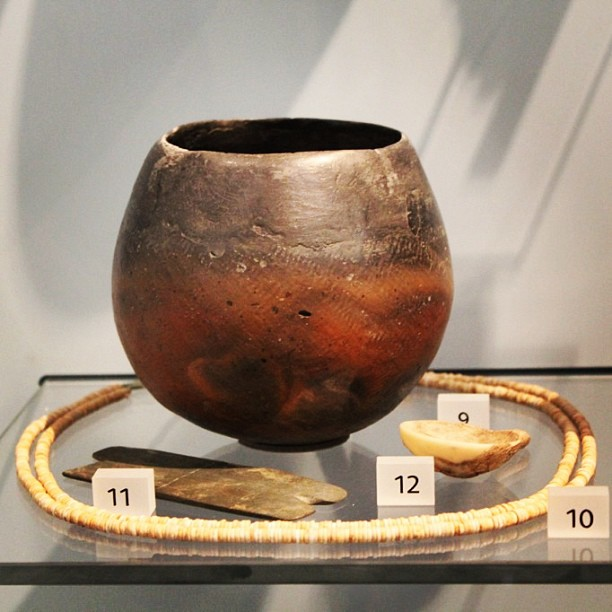
A Badarian culture burial with black-topped pottery. 4500–3850 BCE. Ashmolean Museum

The earliest occurrence of black-topped pottery comes from Nabta Playa in the Western Desert of Egypt dating to 5,810±80 bp, and is most commonly associated with the Predynastic Period in Upper Egypt. Black-topped ware was the predominant type of pottery associated with the Badarian culture and "continued to be typical of pottery production during Amratian culture, or Naqada I, and Naqada IIA–B periods in Upper Egypt." The frequency of black-top pottery began to wane in the Early Dynastic Period during Naqada IIC "and appears to fall out of use by Naqada IID."

The technique continued to be used as late as ca.1802–1640 BCE in Kerma, modern Sudan.

== Technologies ==
=== Materials and methods ===
The first appearance of black-topped pottery was seen in Nabta Playa dating to 5,810±80 bp, a period of increased aridity. Climatic shifts caused changes in mobility and interaction between groups and catalyzed innovations in pottery production. According to archaeologist Kit Nelson, "the multitude of changes that appear in pottery during the Late Neolithic are an important reflection of broader changes that occur during this period."

The introduction of black-topped pottery shows a shift in material use, finishing techniques, and firing methods. From the Middle Neolithic into the Late Neolithic, potters shifted from using more porous, rougher materials found in lake and river deposits to finer clays that were "refined through a process of flotation," a method used to separate small objects from sediments using water. Late Neolithic pottery can include various materials added into the clay body such as sand that is used as a temper, which is any non-plastic material that is used to strengthen the clay and prevent excess shrinkage and cracking during the firing process.

An additional advancement that emerged alongside black-topped pottery is the development of different finishing techniques. A wider variety of finishing techniques can be seen in Late Neolithic pottery including adding slip, which is liquified clay, to vessel surfaces. Much of the pottery found at Nabta Playa feature slips that are applied to alter the surface color, to smooth the surface, and/or to reduce the porosity of the vessel. The application of red slips and self-slips, which maintain the natural color of the clay, indicate that the red surface treatment was an intentional choice made by the potters.

=== Firing techniques ===
The most notable technological advancement that emerged with black-topped pottery is the development of improved firing techniques. Changes in firing techniques "include new methods to achieve higher firing temperatures and the deliberate creation of the black tops." The higher firing temperatures caused stronger vitrification of the clay body which allowed the pottery of the Late Neolithic to be more durable.

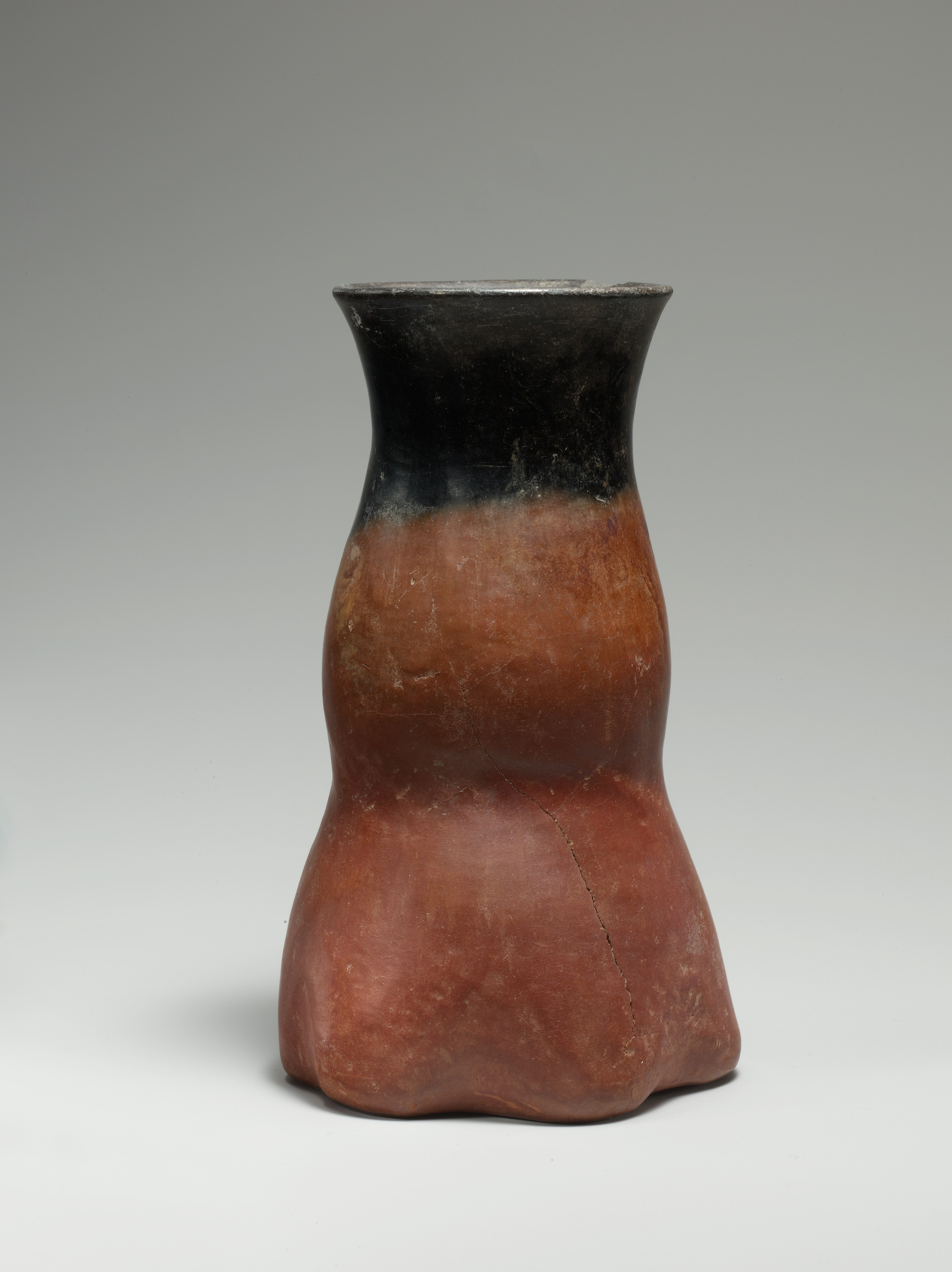
Black-topped red ware jar, Metropolitan Museum of Art

Black-top pottery was made from Nile silts, which fire to a red-brown color once oxidized. The difference in color is caused by the variation in chemical effects on the clay during the firing process. The production techniques used to achieve this black-top effect, however, have been widely debated among archaeologists. Initially it was theorized that the black color was caused by a lack of oxygen. Egyptologist Flinders Petrie, one of the first archaeologists to discuss black-topped pottery, suggested that during the firing process the top portion of the vessels would be partially buried in ashes so that “as the charcoal covered them it deoxidised the iron from red peroxide to black magnetic oxide." Petrie also claimed that the black top was achieved in a single firing session.

This theory would later be contested by Alfred Lucas, an analytical chemist, who theorized that the black top was a chemical effect caused by carbon as opposed to a lack of oxygen, and that the technique the Egyptians used would have required two firing sessions. Eventually a Mossbauer spectroscopy conducted for Recent Advances in Science and Technology of Materials in 1974 proved that the black top was created by “a combination of reduction and carbon smudging and not the result of the presence of carbon only” as Lucas had theorized. Lucas’ two-phase production process, which is the more commonly accepted theory, consists of an initial firing process in which the ware would be removed from the kiln during the red-hot stage (approximately 540 degrees Celsius) and “placed mouth downwards on a layer of sawdust.”

=== Surface polishing ===
The surface is highly polished and lustered, giving a shiny result to the red body, and even a metallic-like luster to the top black portion.

=== Porosity ===
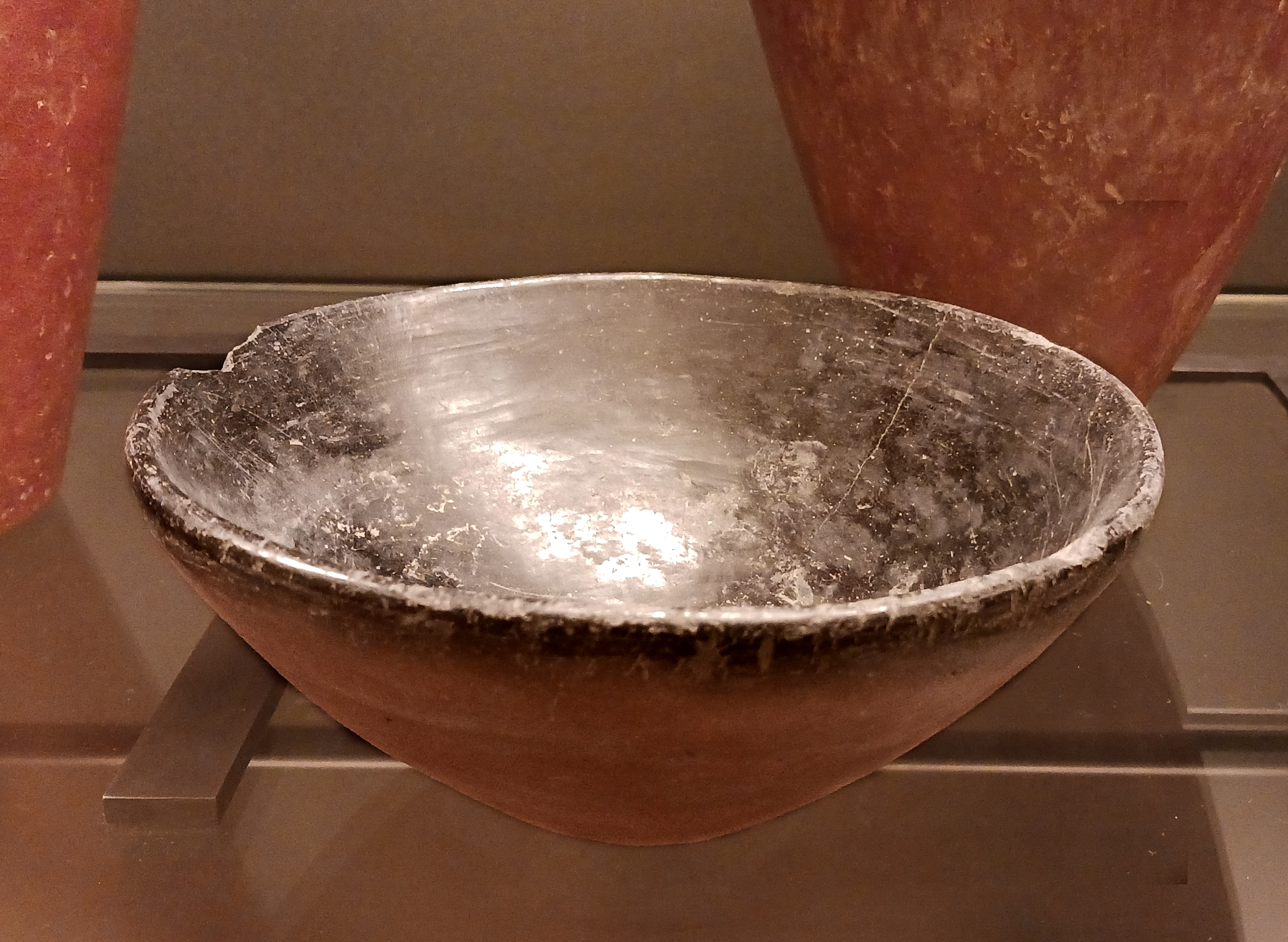
The black surface covered the inside of the vessels. Black-top red ware vessel. Naqada I-first half of Naqada II. 3800-3400 BCE. Louvre Museum

A notable feature of black-topped ware is that the porosity of the blackened rim and interior is significantly less than that of the red exterior. This feature can give archaeologists insight into the contents and function of these vessels. The variation in porosity suggests that the addition of the black top may have been an enhancement of functionality as opposed to solely a stylistic choice. This theory is supported by the fact that upon the introduction of marl clay in Egypt and Sudan, the presence of black-top pottery began to wane. Marl clay was able to be fired at higher temperatures than Nile silt, thus the porosity of this ware was naturally lower.

=== Form ===
Black-topped ware typically takes the form of the Egyptian hes-jar, which are tall shouldered jars that were used for pouring libations. "The jars are characterized by splaying, conical feel, high shoulders, and narrow necks." During the Predynastic Period, in Dynasty I-II, pottery was made by hand, and wheel-made pottery did not emerge until Dynasty III.

== Function ==
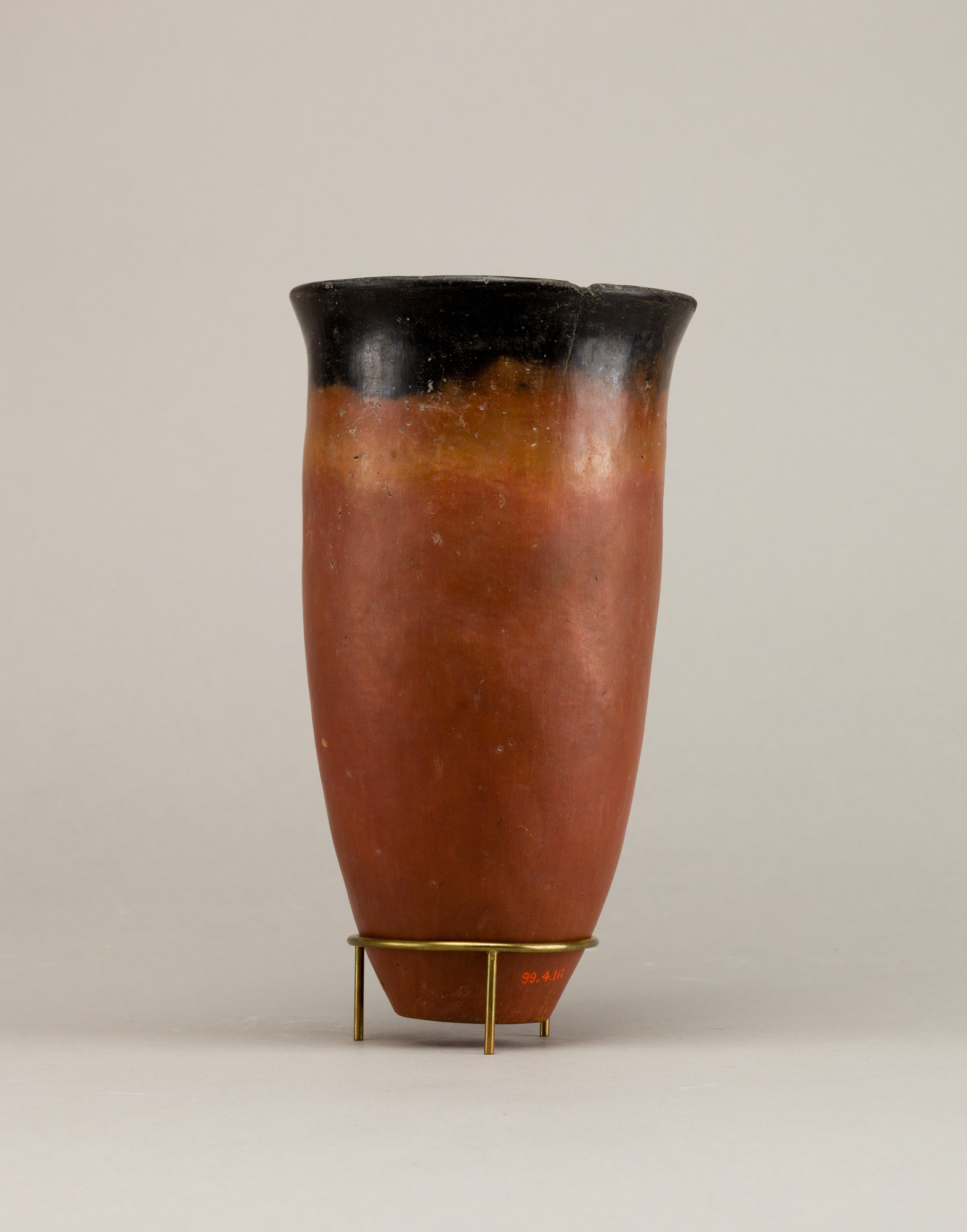
Black-topped red ware beaker, Metropolitan Museum of Art

=== Ritual use ===
Black-topped pottery is exclusively found in cemeteries and cultic deposits, and the appearance of black-topped vessels "probably echoes the actual use of such jars in Early Dynastic temple or funerary ritual." Archaeologist Karin Sowada postulates that the religious function of black-topped pottery is demonstrated via two-dimensional artwork from the Early Dynastic Period. Multiple objects from Fourth Dynasty tombs in Giza depict these vessels being used in rituals or as offerings. In the Fourth Dynasty slab stela of Wepemnofret, the prince is "seated before a table of offerings including a black-topped jar." The surrounding imagery indicates that the vessel may have been "used for the offering of ritual liquids in funerary rites." Additionally, on the mid-Fourth Dynasty slab stela of Princess Nefertiabet, a black-topped vase is seen to the right of the princess's head. Similar to the slab stela of Wepemnofret, this depiction is also surrounded by imagery related to liquid offerings.

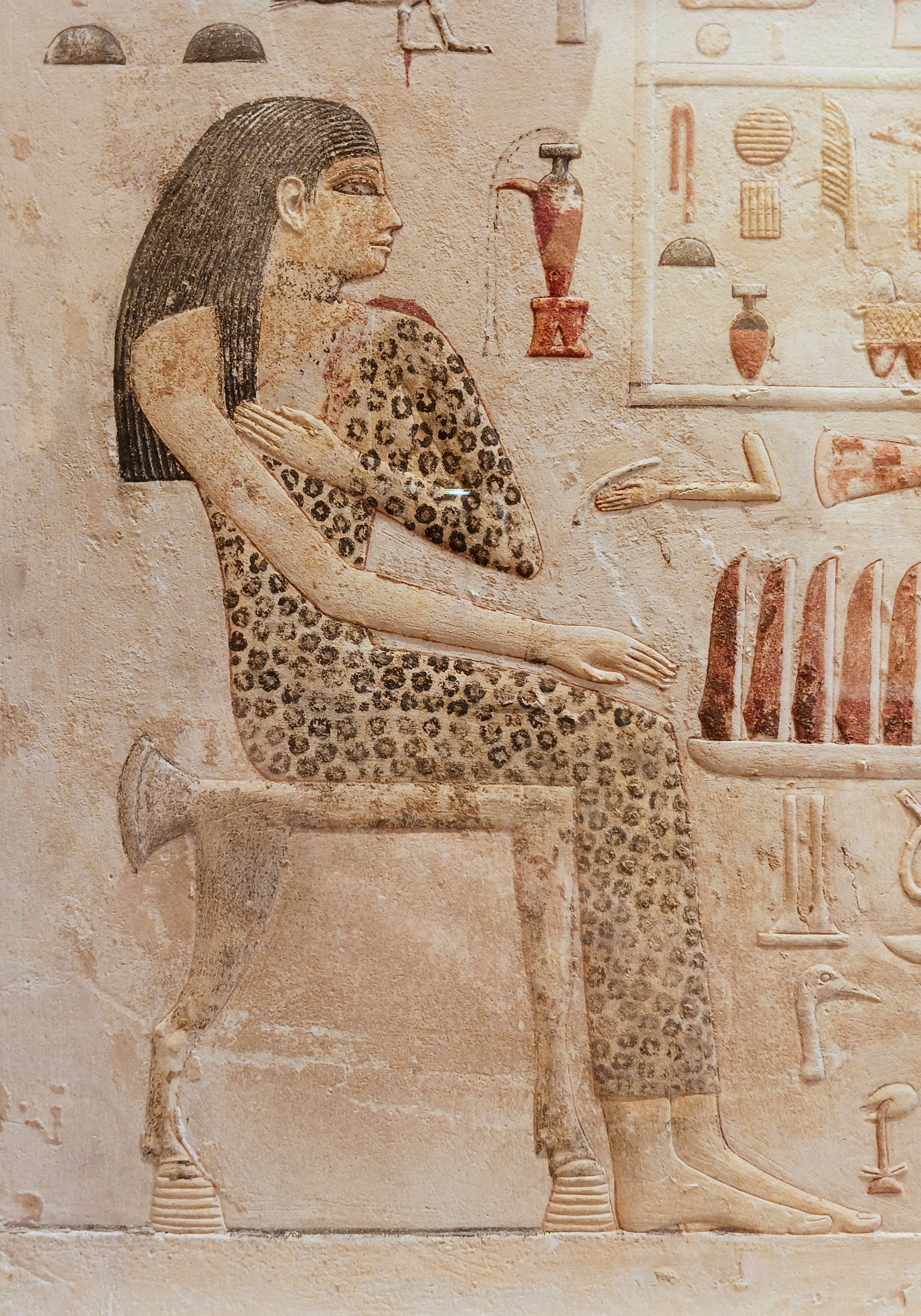
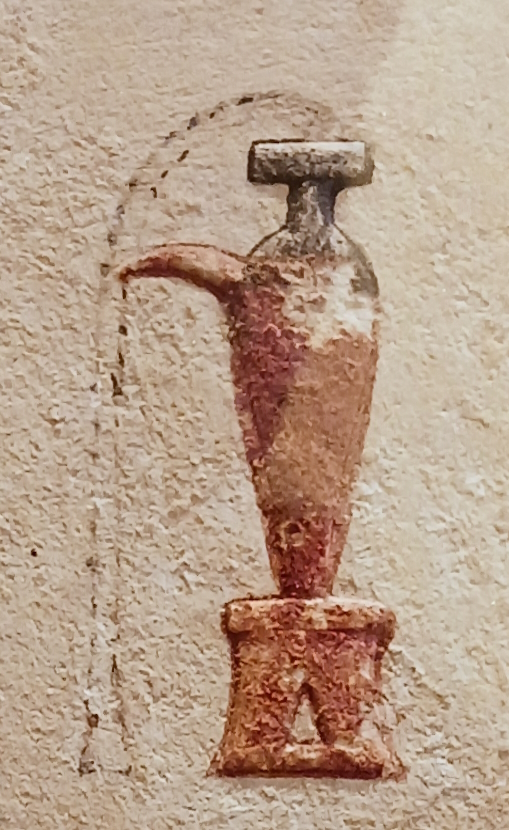
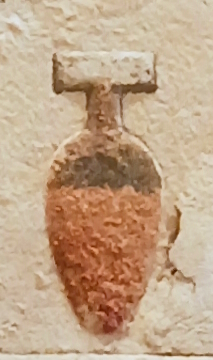
Princess Nefertiabet with a black-topped vessels (2590-2565 BCE). Louvre Museum E 15591

Moreover, Sowada states that the unique two-toned red and black color scheme can be attributed to symbolism. The black-topped vessels in Sowada's corpus "are all from cemetery and cultic deposits," and the appearance of black-topped ware can give insight to the function of such vessels in temple or funerary ritual. In Egyptian art, red and black had symbolic significance, where "red is the color of chaos and death and black is the color of fertile land of Egypt and resurrection." This claim argues that the black top coupled with the polished red surface represents the duality life and death and was an intentional reference to the symbolic significance of red and black in Egyptian funerary practices. The liquid contents of the vessels then represented the Nile and the renewal process associated with the river's cycle of flooding and fertilization. Sowada also suggests that the desire to create two-toned vessels may have been an attempt by potters to copy Predynastic stone craftsmen that were making two-toned stone vessels out of basalt and limestone. She states, "black-topped ceramic jars were possibly an attempt by potters to copy stone jars in clay, or vice versa."

=== Alternate uses ===
There are multiple alternative theories concerning the function of black-topped pottery and the reasoning behind the color scheme. Egyptologist Winifred Needler theorizes that the similarities in surface treatment indicate a possible association with polished red ware. "The fabric and polished red surface are identical with the polished red ware, and like the latter it was shaped by hand and baked," however, black-topped vessels tend to vary in form compared to red polished vessels which have thinner necks and often more detailed rims. This variation in form could be attributed to the necessity for a wider and more simple rim when creating the black top and interior, and does not negate the possibility of a relationship between black-topped ware and red polished ware.

Another theory suggests that the black top may be mimicking black-lipped gourd vessels. According to archaeologist A. J. Arkell, the undoubted origin of the black-topped motif in pottery is tied to gourd cups in Sudan which have a black rim, "for when a gourd is cut in half to make two bowls, its rim is always fired, presumably in order to prevent it tasting or splintering." Arkell states that it was natural for potters to try to recreate the black rim because "a gourd would not look right without a black rim." This theory argues that the black top was not immediately a matter of function, but an aesthetic choice influenced by a tradition that was created for the functionality of alternative materials.

== Gallery ==
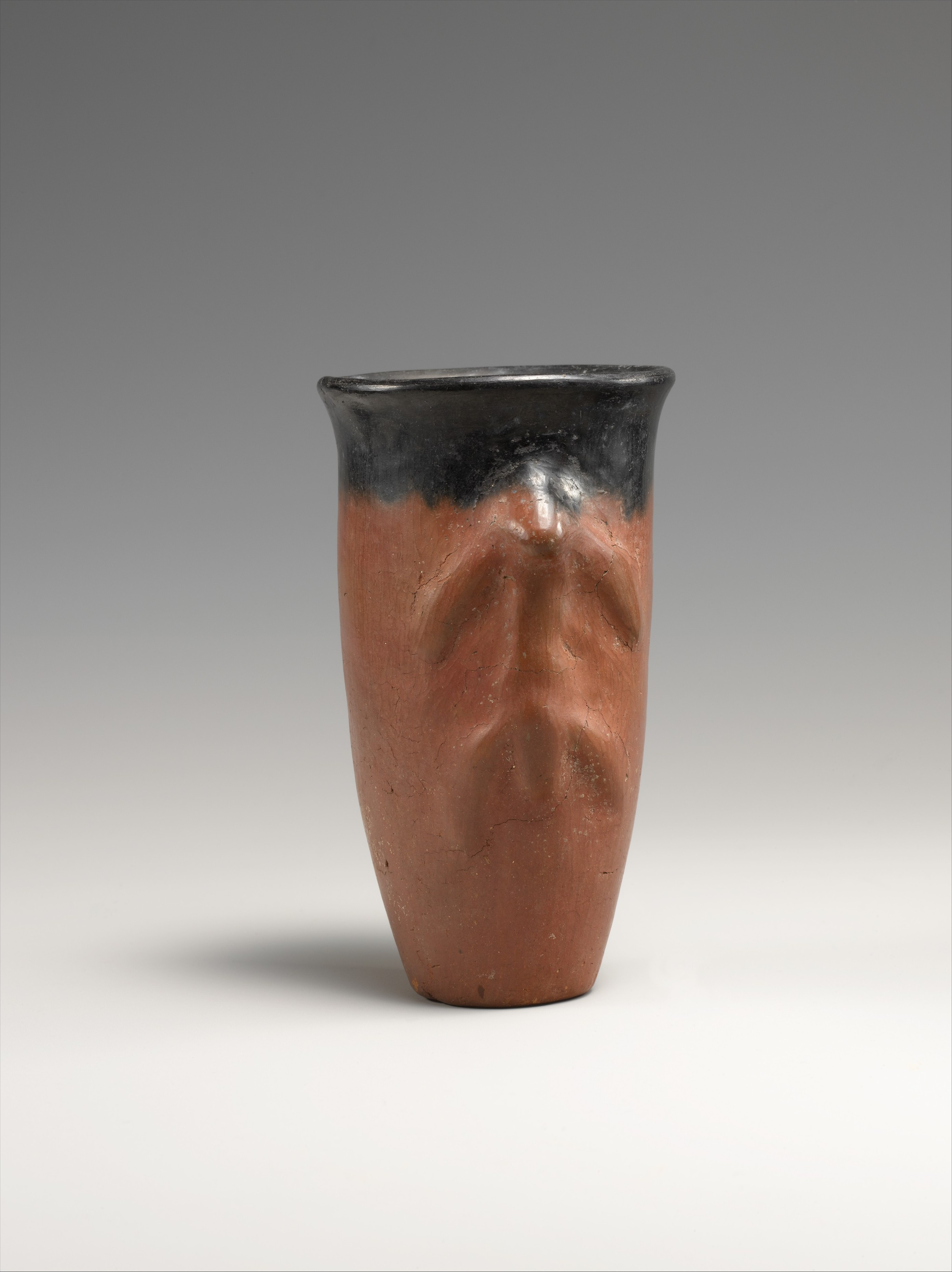
Black-topped red ware jar with a climbing animal, Metropolitan Museum of Art

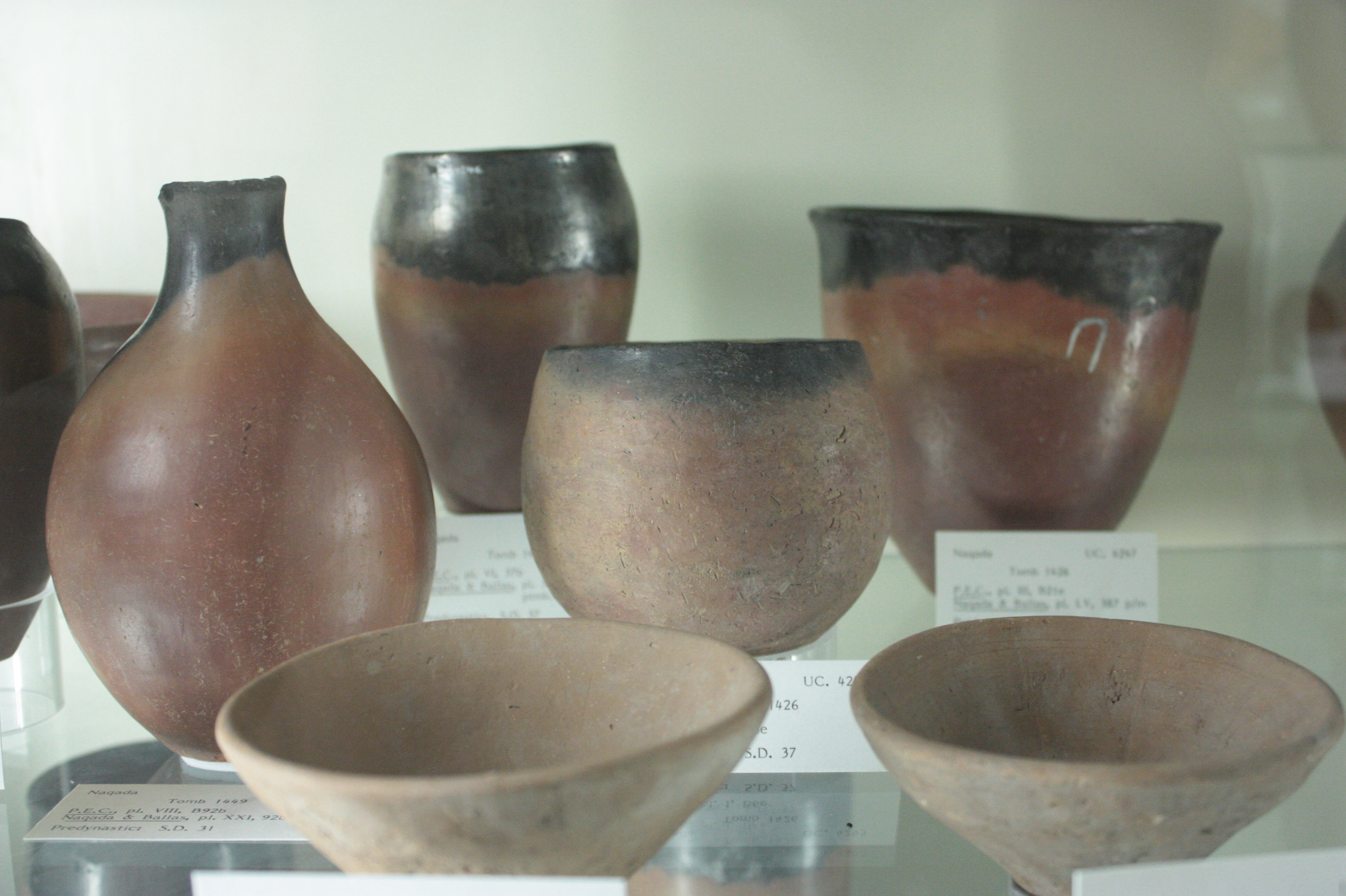
The distinctive black-topped Egyptian pottery of the Predynastic period associated with Flinders Petrie's Sequence Dating System

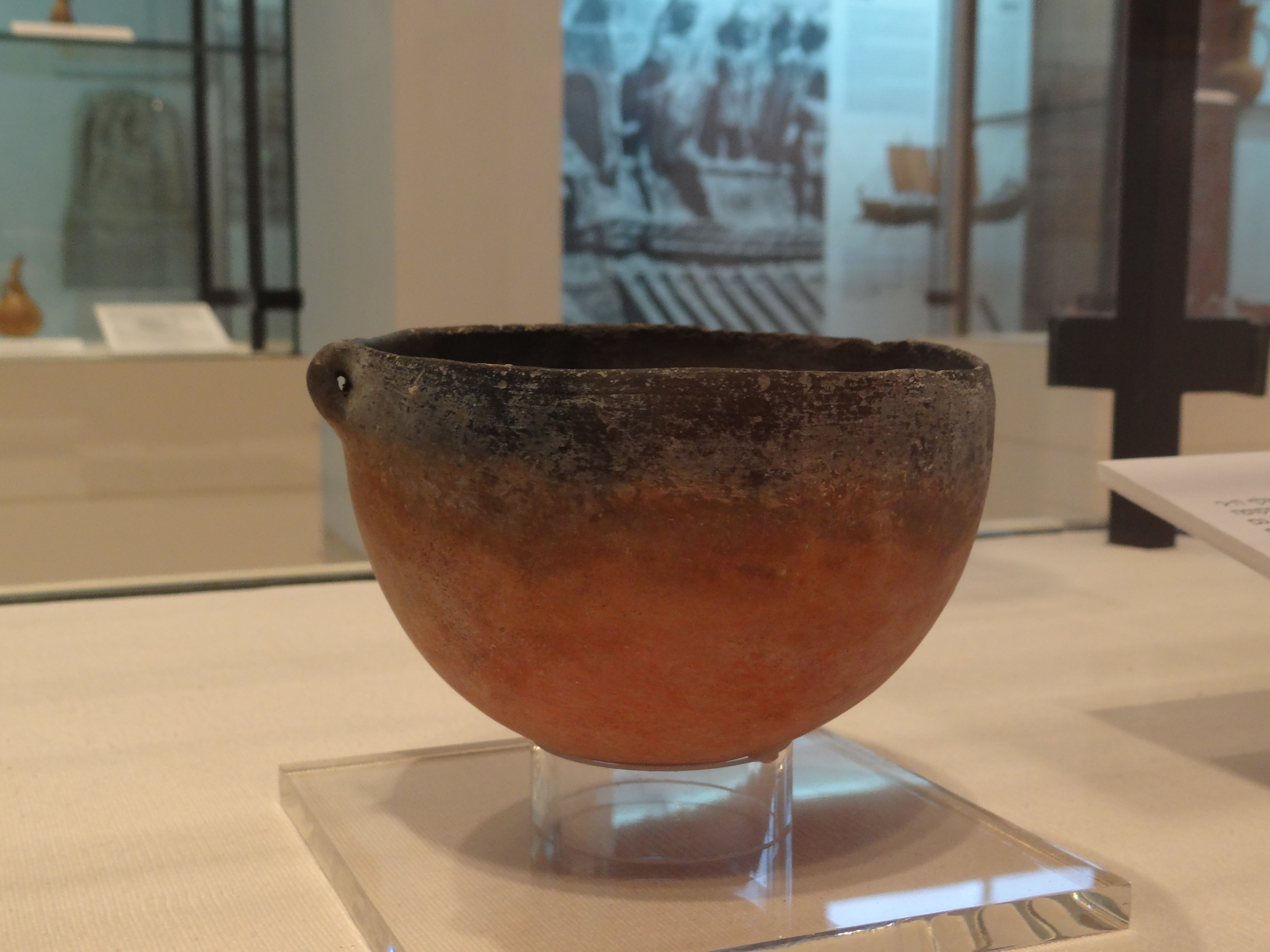
Black-topped red ware bowl, Israeli National Maritime Museum

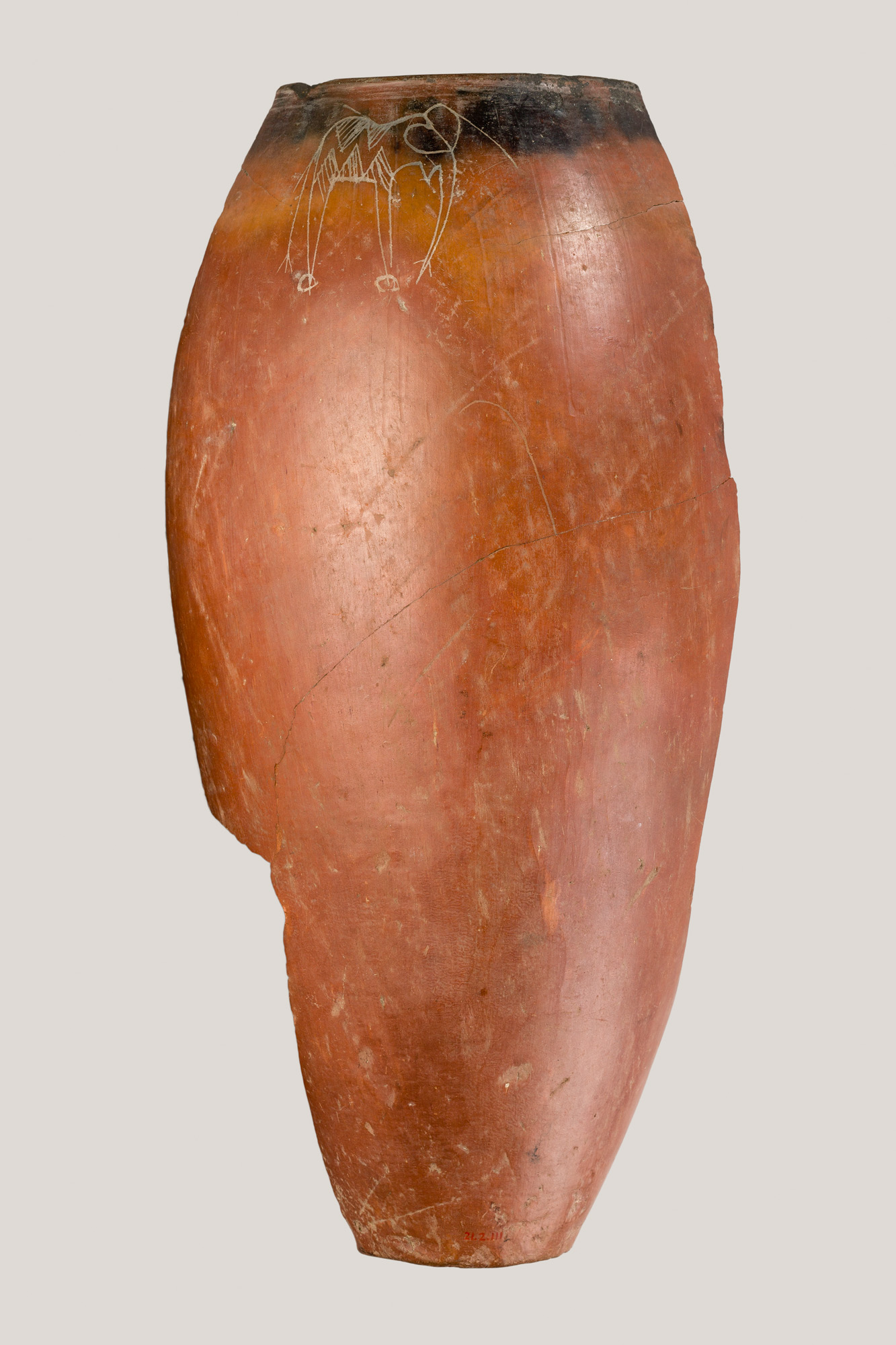
Sherd from a Black-topped Red Ware Beaker with a Graffito of an Elephant, Metropolitan Museum of Art

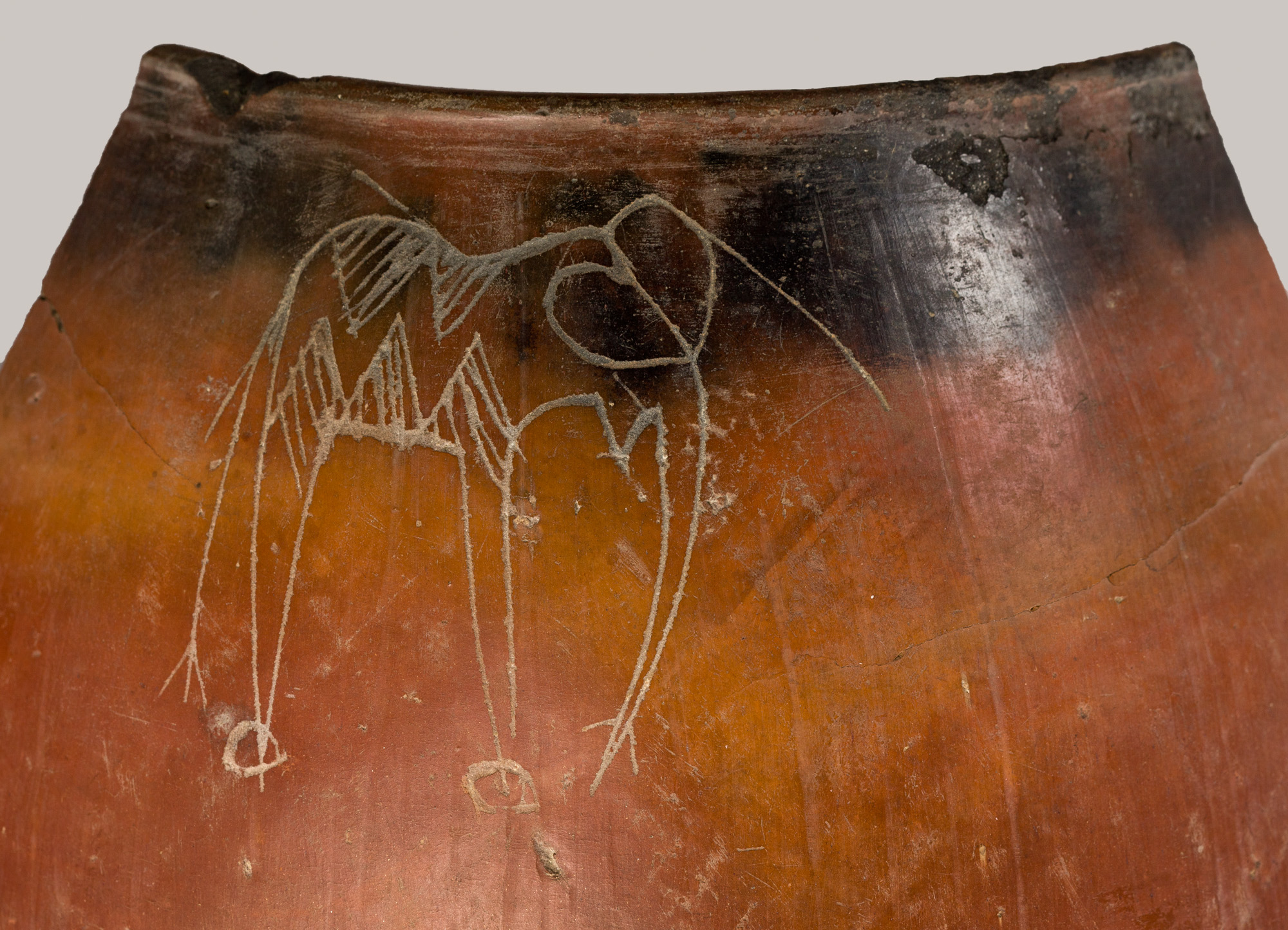
Sherd from a Black-topped Red Ware Beaker with a Graffito of an Elephant (detail picture), Metropolitan Museum of Art
