= List of common forms of African red slip ware =

This is a table of common forms of African red slip ware.

Form	Start date	End date
Hayes form 1	50	80
Hayes form 2	50	100
Hayes form 3	60	200
Hayes form 3a	60	90
Hayes form 3b	75	150
Hayes form 3c	100	200
Hayes form 4	75	175
Hayes form 4a	75	125
Hayes form 4b	125	175
Hayes form 5	60	150
Hayes form 5a	60	100
Hayes form 5b	60	100
Hayes form 5c	60	150
Hayes form 6	100	200
Hayes form 6	100	200
Hayes form 6b	100	200
Hayes form 6c	100	200
Hayes form 7 Bowl	70	150
Hayes form 7a Bowl	60	125
Hayes form 7b Bowl	100	200
Hayes form 8	75	200
Hayes form 8a	75	160
Hayes form 8b	150	200
Hayes form 9	100	200
Hayes form 9a	100	160
Hayes form 9b	150	200
Hayes form 10	100	200
Hayes form 10a	100	150
Hayes form 10b	150	200
Hayes form 11	100	200
Hayes form 12/102	475	500
Hayes form 13	100	150
Hayes form 14	125	200
Hayes form 14a	125	175
Hayes form 14b	150	200
Hayes form 15	150	200
Hayes form 16	150	200
Hayes form 17	150	200
Hayes form 18	200	225
Hayes form 19	75	125
Hayes form 20	75	125
Hayes form 21	100	150
Hayes form 22	100	150
Hayes form 23 Casserole	70	220
Hayes form 23a Casserole	70	150
Hayes form 23b Casserole	150	220
Hayes form 24 Dish	175	225
Hayes form 25 Rectangular Dish	100	200
Hayes form 26 Flat Dish	150	225
Hayes form 27 Dish	160	220
Hayes form 28 Dish	200	225
Hayes form 29 Dish	200	220
Hayes form 30 Dish	200	250
Hayes form 31 Dish	200	250
Hayes form 32	210	300
Hayes form 32/58	280	420
Hayes form 33	200	250
Hayes form 44 Small Bowl	220	300
Hayes form 45 Large Bowl	200	300
Hayes form 45a Large Bowl	230	320
Hayes form 46 Large Bowl	275	325
Hayes form 48 Plate	220	320
Hayes form 50 Large Dish	230	300
Hayes form 50a Large Dish	230	300
Hayes form 50b Large Dish	250	350
Hayes form 52 Small Bowl	300	400
Hayes form 52b Small Bowl	280	400
Hayes form 53	320	430
Hayes form 54 Dish	350	400
Hayes form 57	350	450
Hayes form 56 Dish	360	430
Hayes form 57	325	400
Hayes form 58	290	550
Hayes form 58a	290	375
Hayes form 58b	290	375
Hayes form 59	320	420
Hayes form 59a	320	450
Hayes form 59b	320	420
Hayes form 61b	325	475
Hayes form 61a	325	400
Hayes form 61b	380	475
Hayes form 62	350	425
Hayes form 63	360	440
Hayes form 64	380	450
Hayes form 67	360	470
Hayes form 68	350	425
Hayes form 71	370	450
Hayes form 72	400	430
Hayes form 73	400	450
Hayes form 74	400	450
Hayes form 76	400	475
Hayes form 76a	425	475
Hayes form 76b	400	450
Hayes form 78	360	440
Hayes form 79	400	500
Hayes form 80b	500	550
Hayes form 80b/99	450	500
Hayes form 81	400	500
Hayes form 81a	400	500
Hayes form 81b	400	500
Hayes form 82	430	500
Hayes form 82a	430	475
Hayes form 82b	460	500
Hayes form 83	420	460
Hayes form 84	440	500
Hayes form 85	450	500
Hayes form 85a	450	450
Hayes form 85b	450	500
Hayes form 86	475	525
Hayes form 87	450	550
Hayes form 87a	450	500
Hayes form 87b	475	530
Hayes form 87c	480	550
Hayes form 88	500	550
Hayes form 89	450	520
Hayes form 90	550	620
Hayes form 90b	500	550
Hayes form 91	350	450
Hayes form 91a	370	500
Hayes form 91a/b	370	500
Hayes form 91b	370	500
Hayes form 91b/c	500	530
Hayes form 91c	500	600
Hayes form 91d	580	675
Hayes form 92	400	540
Hayes form 93	470	540
Hayes form 93a	470	500
Hayes form 93b	500	540
Hayes form 94	400	550
Hayes form 96	500	550
Hayes form 97	475	600
Hayes form 98	500	580
Hayes form 99	500	580
Hayes form 99a	500	540
Hayes form 99b	530	580
Hayes form 99c	560	620
Hayes form 100	580	620
Hayes form 101	550	600
Hayes form 102	475	625
Hayes form 103	500	575
Hayes form 103a	500	575
Hayes form 103b	500	575
Hayes form 104	500	625
Hayes form 104a	500	580
Hayes form 104b	570	600
Hayes form 104c	550	625
Hayes form 105	580	675
Hayes form 106	600	675
Hayes form 107	580	675
Hayes form 108	600	630
Hayes form 109	580	675
Hayes form 109	580	650
Hayes form 109	610	675
Hayes form 182	150	250
Hayes form 195	70	250
Hayes form 196	70	250
Hayes form 197	175	
