= Redware =

Various types of red-colored pottery

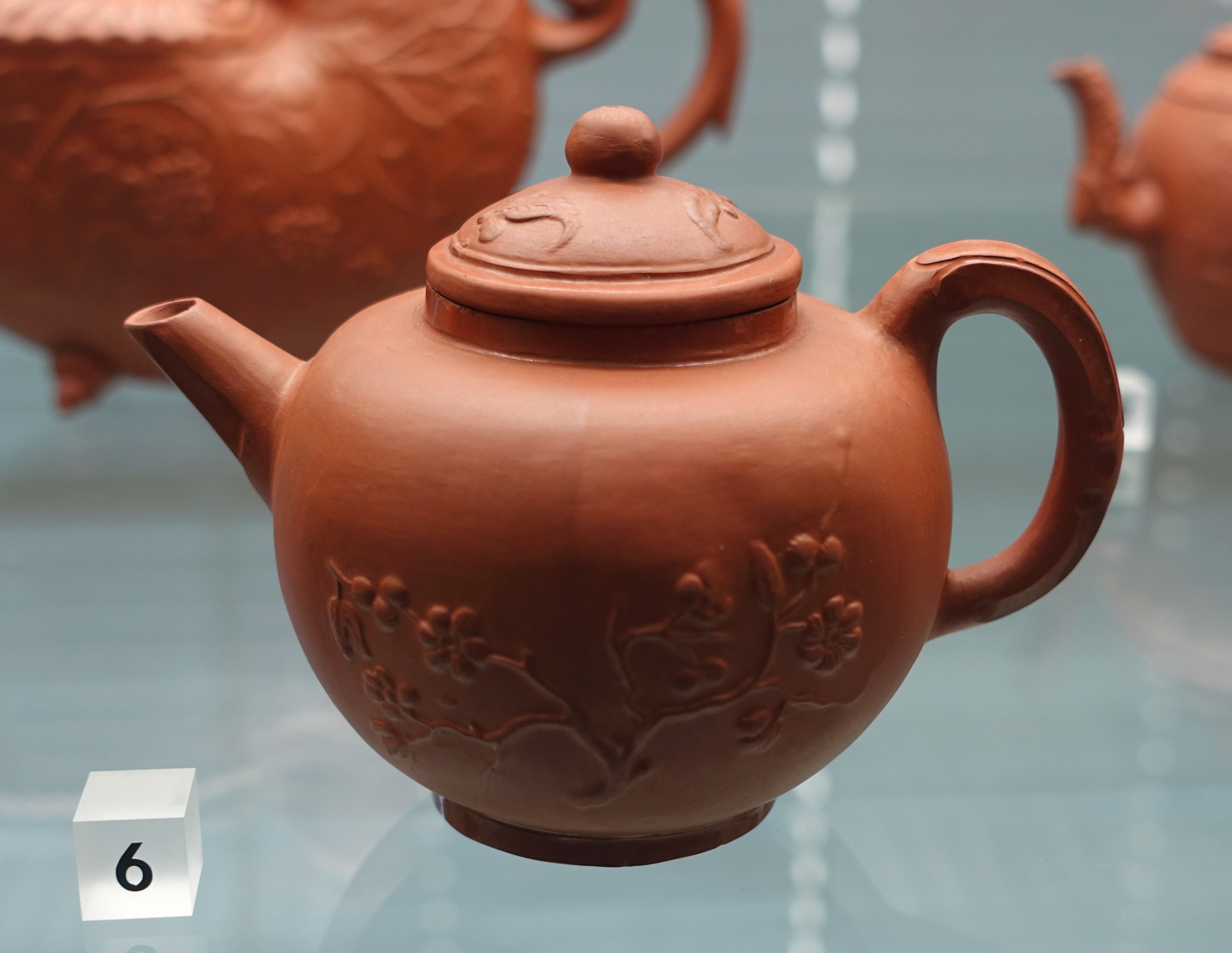
Redware teapot, Delft, c. 1680, red stoneware imitating Chinese Yixing ware.

Redware as a single word is a term for at least two types of pottery of the last few centuries, in Europe and North America. Red ware as two words is a term used for pottery, mostly by archaeologists, found in a very wide range of places. However, these distinct usages are not always adhered to, especially when referring to the many different types of pre-colonial red wares in the Americas, which may be called "redware".

In the great majority of cases the "red" concerned is the natural reddish-brown of the fired clay, and the same sort of colour as in terracotta (which most types of red ware could also be called) or red brick. The colour to which clay turns when fired varies considerably with its geological makeup and the conditions of firing, and as well as terracotta red, covers a wide range of blacks, browns, greys, whites and yellows.

Of the two "redware" types, both made between the 17th to 19th centuries (with modern revivals or imitations), the European was unglazed stoneware, mostly for teapots, jugs and mugs, and moderately, sometimes very, expensive. The American redware was cheap earthenware, very often with a ceramic glaze, used for a wide variety of kitchen and dining functions, as well as objects such as chamberpots.

== Redware ==
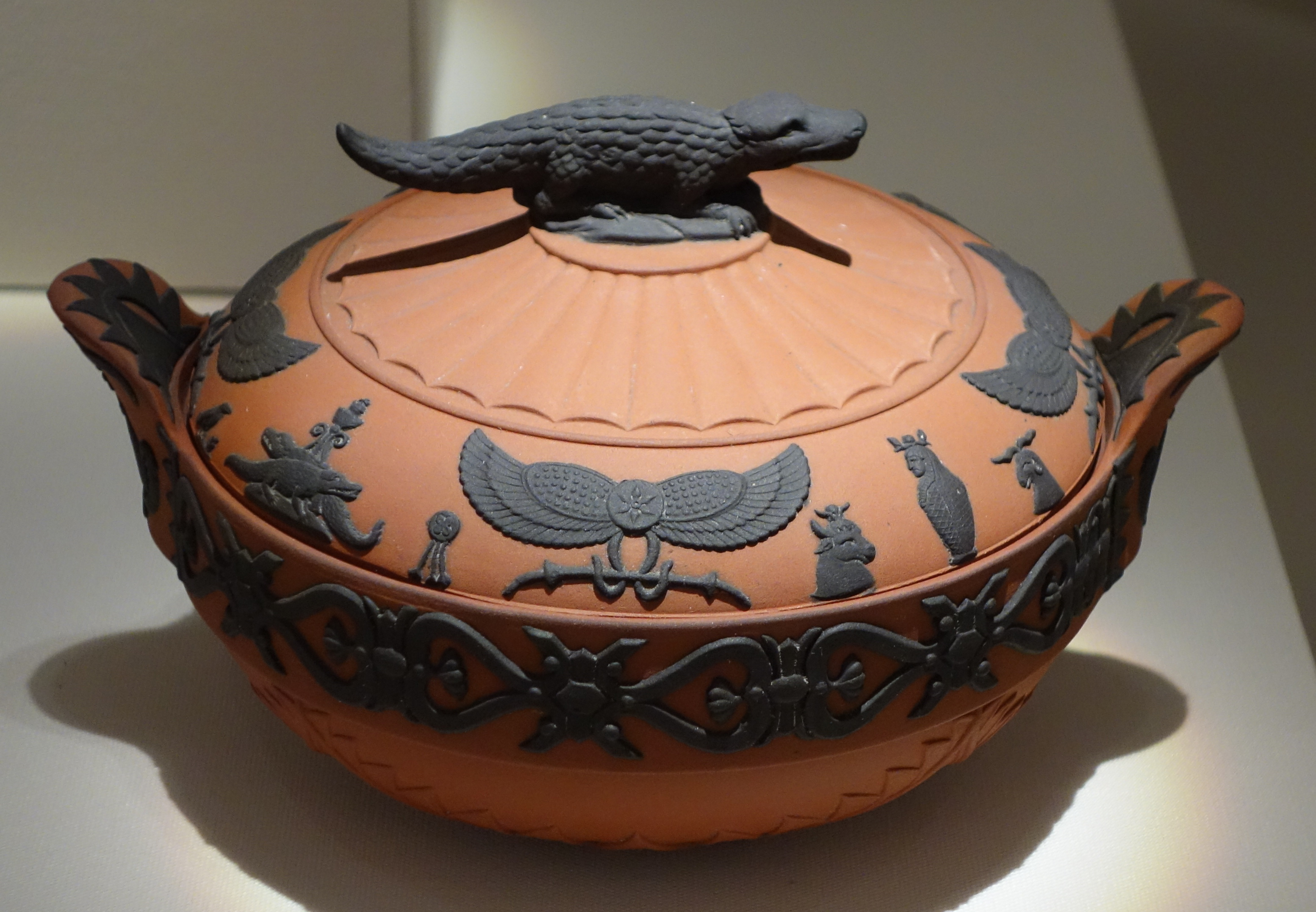
Covered Sugar Bowl, Wedgwood, 1805–1815, in Rosso Antico ware with fashionable "Neo-Egyptian" decoration

=== European ===
In European contexts "redware" usually means an unglazed ("dry-bodied") stoneware, typically used for serving or drinking drinks. The term is especially used for pottery from the 17th and 18th centuries, before porcelain, whether imported from East Asia or made in Europe, became cheap enough to be used very widely. In this period red stoneware was used for vessels, especially teapots, jugs and mugs, which were relatively expensive and carefully made and decorated. Chinese Yixing clay teapots, an unglazed stoneware type made from a special type of clay, came to Holland through the East India companies with tea consignments and provided exemplars which were often copied with various degrees of closeness. Soon a European design vocabulary was used as well.

A Delftware manufacturer announced in 1678 that he was making "red teapots", of which no examples are known to survive. The Dutch Elers brothers brought the style to Staffordshire pottery in the 1690s, after finding a suitable source of clay, and were widely imitated there. Some red stoneware by rival Dutch potters including Ary de Milde from the years around 1700 does survive, closely copying Yixing pots in style. Johann Friedrich Böttger was in contact with some of these and developed a rival "Böttger ware", a dark red stoneware first sold in 1710, and manufactured and imitated by others, all up to about 1740. It was Böttger's first commercial ware and a significant stage in his development of porcelain in Europe, which he was soon making at the Meissen porcelain factory. Josiah Wedgwood later refined the type, and gave the decoration a fashionable turn towards Neoclassicism, with his "Rosso Antico" body. This was usually decorated with sprigged reliefs in black, creating pleasing contrasts like those in his earlier Jasperware.

=== American ===
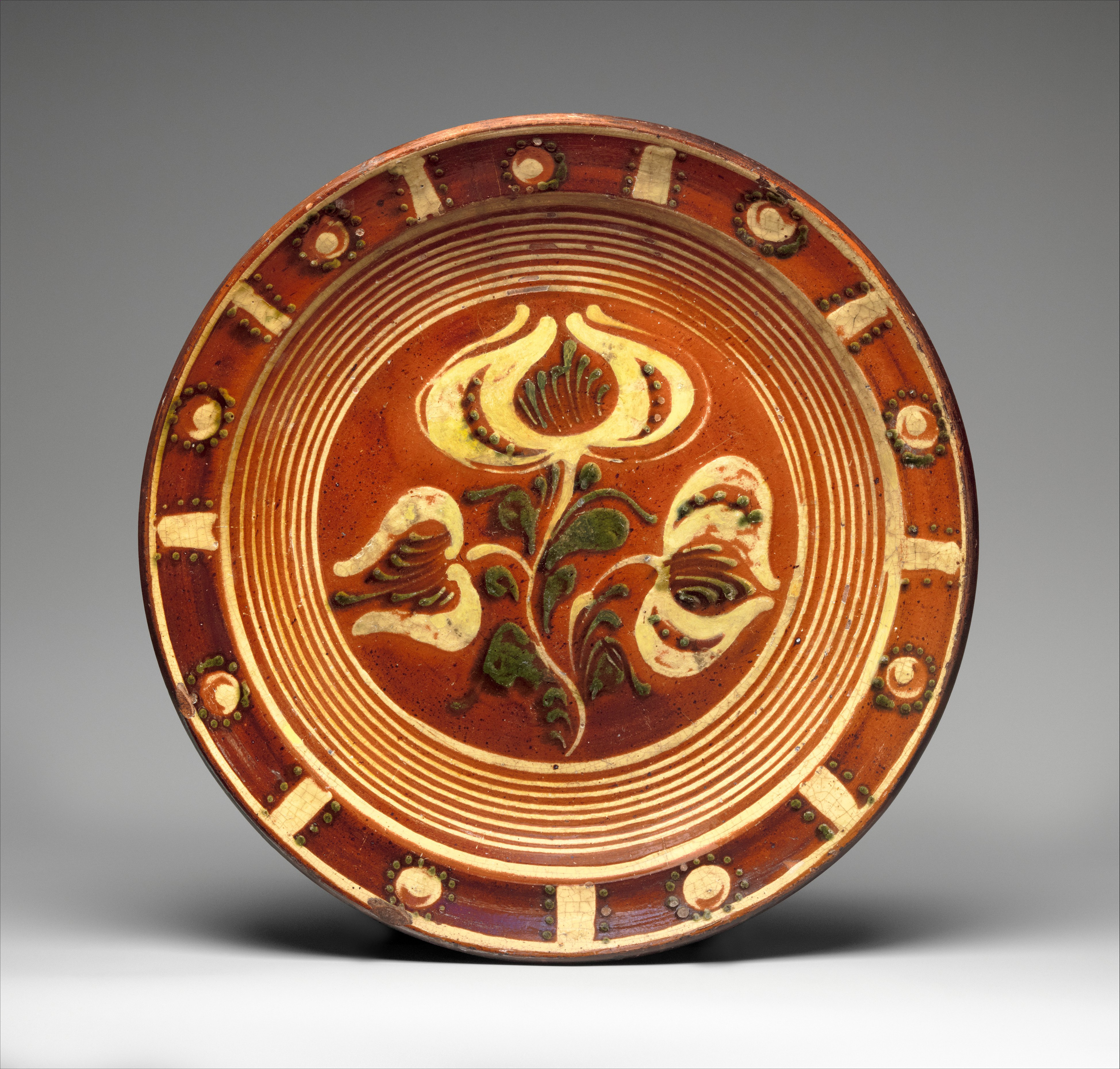
American redware slip-decorated dish, around 1800

In American contexts "redware" usually means earthenware with a reddish body, whether glazed or not. In fact it was very often given a white or other glaze, either tin-glazed or lead-glazed, though it is more usual to describe them as lead-glazed. Depending on the locality, this was the basic utilitarian pottery of the Colonial period of North America. It was often complemented by imported or American stoneware for large vessels where the added strength was useful. The name distinguishes the type from various other earthenwares with white, grey or yellow colours to the fired body, depending on the particular clay used. Some redware was imported from England. Later, American stoneware in particular, and various types of modern wares, including porcelain, took over for many types of objects.

Major museum collections concentrate on the larger dishes, platters and jugs that are glazed, often in yellowish tones, and painted with bold folk art designs, even well into the 19th century. But these special decorated pieces are rather untypical of the mass of sherds found by archaeologists excavating sites of the period. Many of these fancy pieces are dated, signed or marked with a stamp.

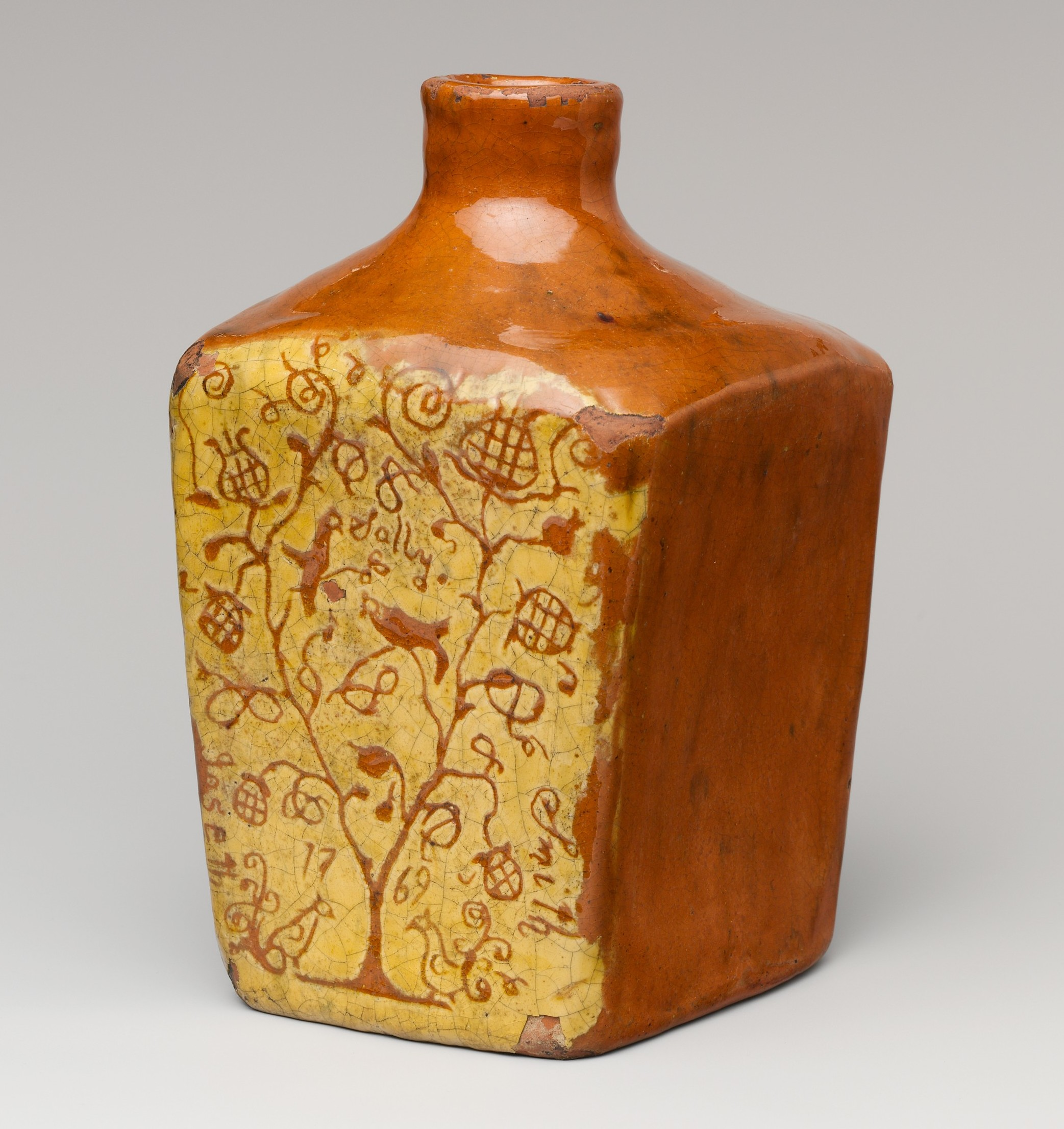
Tea caddy, with "Sally Smith 1769" in the painting. Bucks County, Wrightstown, Pennsylvania

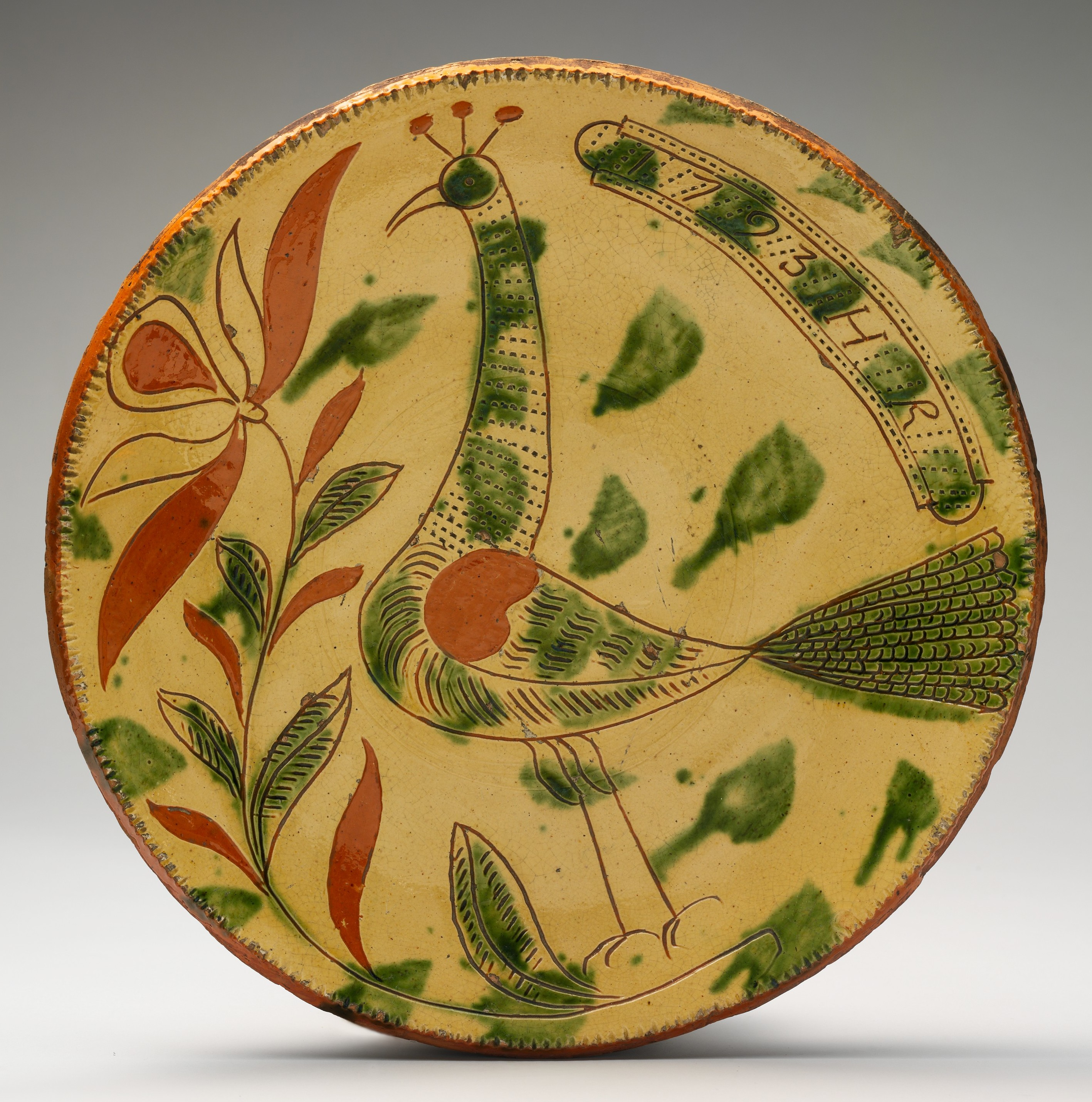
Dish with sgraffito decoration, inscribed "1793 HR", perhaps for Heinrich Roth, a potter then active in Northampton County, Pennsylvania.

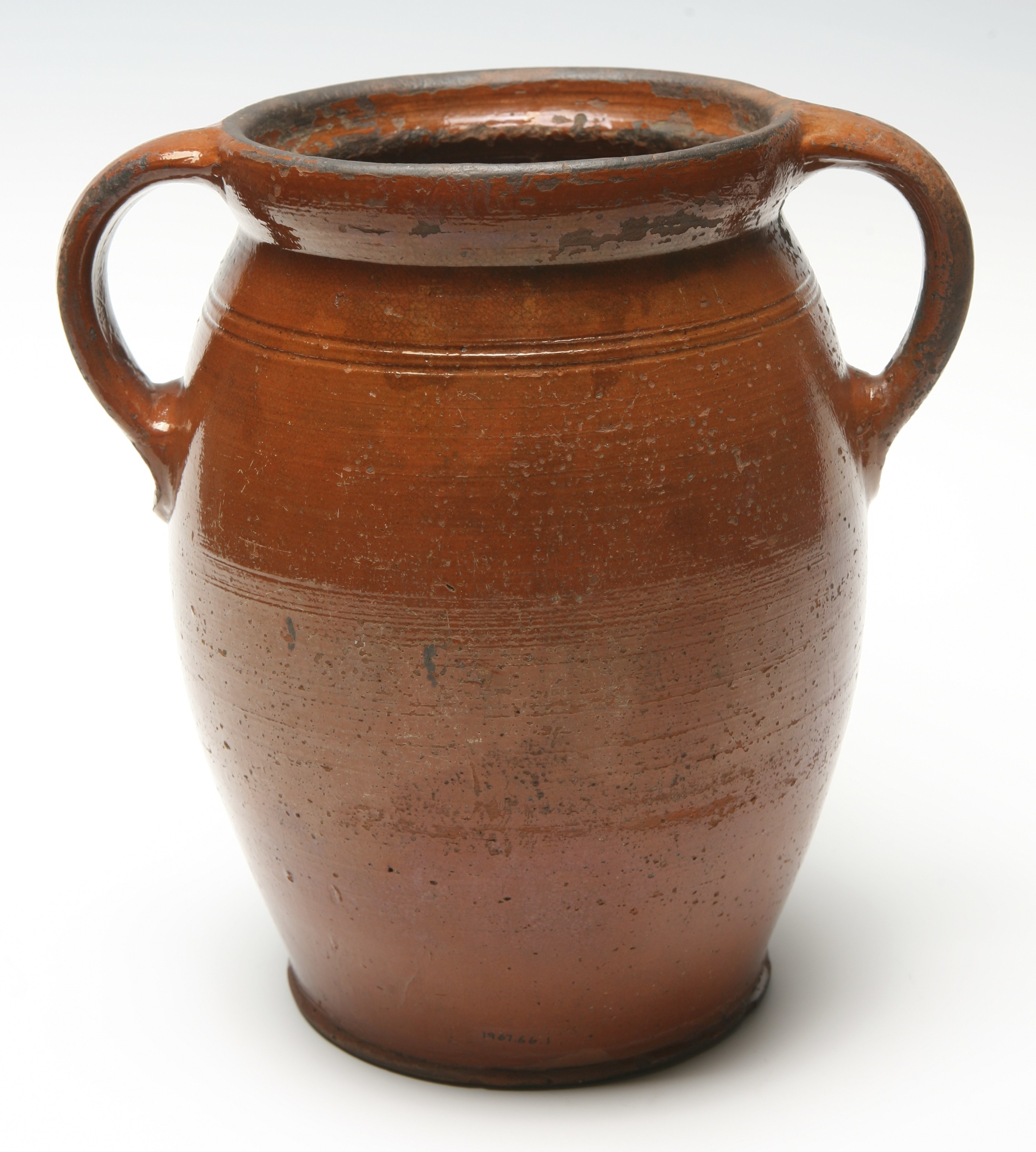
Utilitarian glazed water jar

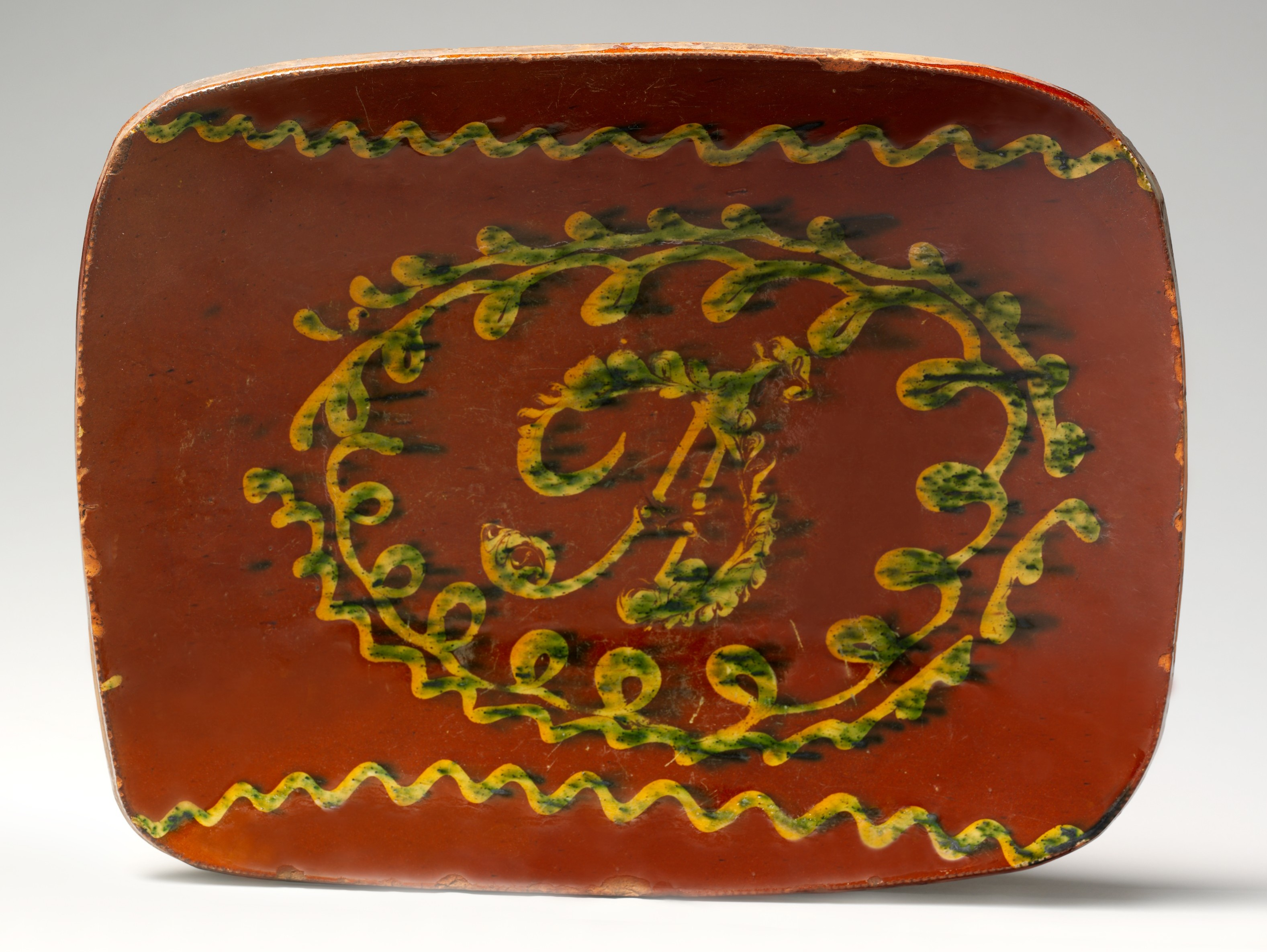
Platter, 1790s, slip decoration, Norwalk, Connecticut

== Red ware ==
"Red ware" is widely used in archaeology to distinguish local types of red pottery from types with other colours found in the same region. Generally these are unglazed earthenware where the red colour is easily visible in complete pieces. Examples of types include: Red Polished Ware, of which there are five main unrelated types, all ancient, from Egypt, India, Cyprus, North Africa, and Roman Europe; the Black and red ware culture of Bronze Age India (individual objects are either black or red); African red slip ware; Roman "red gloss ware" or Terra sigillata; Salado or Roosevelt Red Ware, Arizona, c. 1280 to 1450 AD, and one form of Romano-British Crambeck Ware.

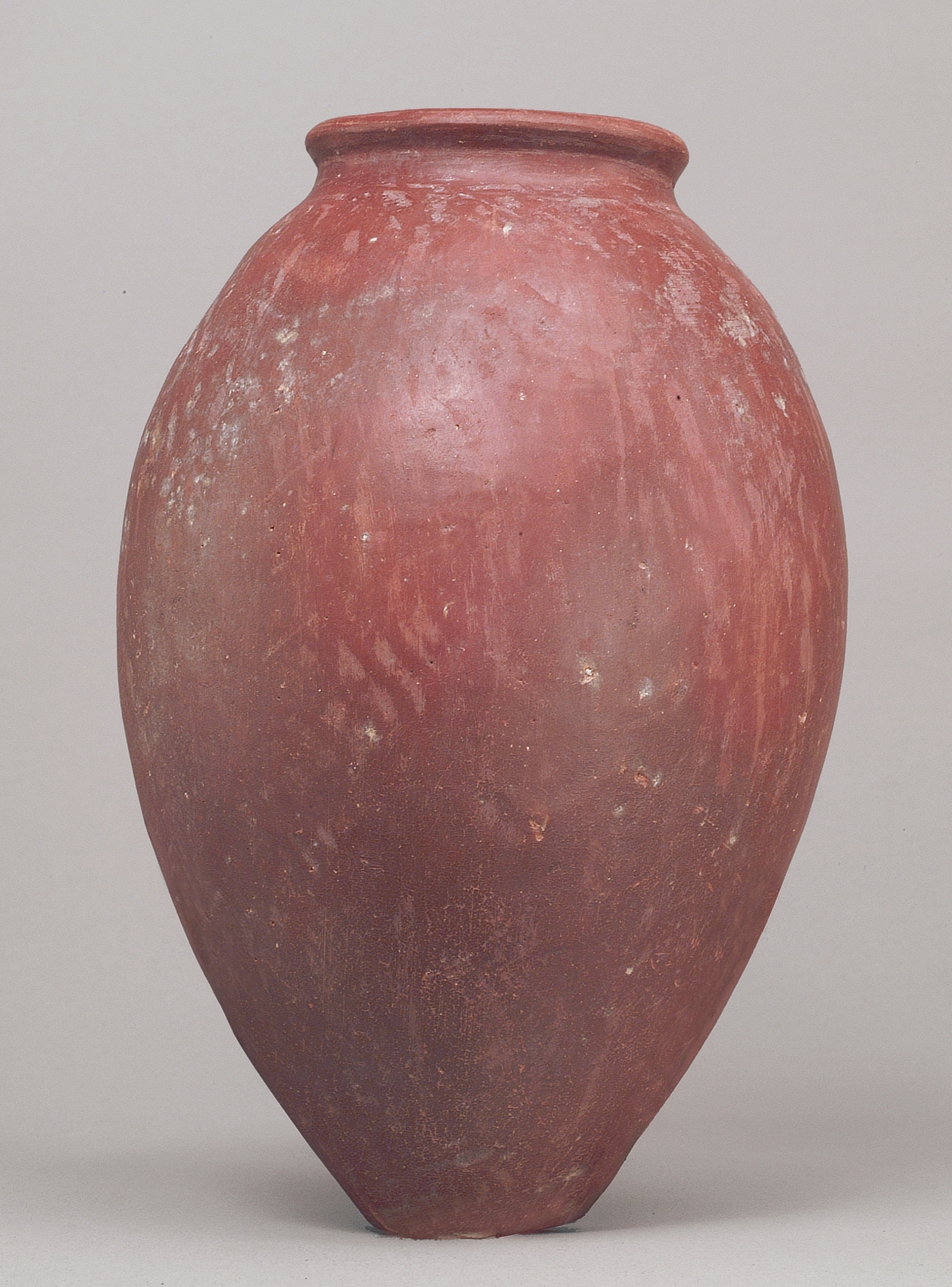
Egyptian "red polished ware" jar, circa 3650 –3300 BC, Predynastic, Naqada II

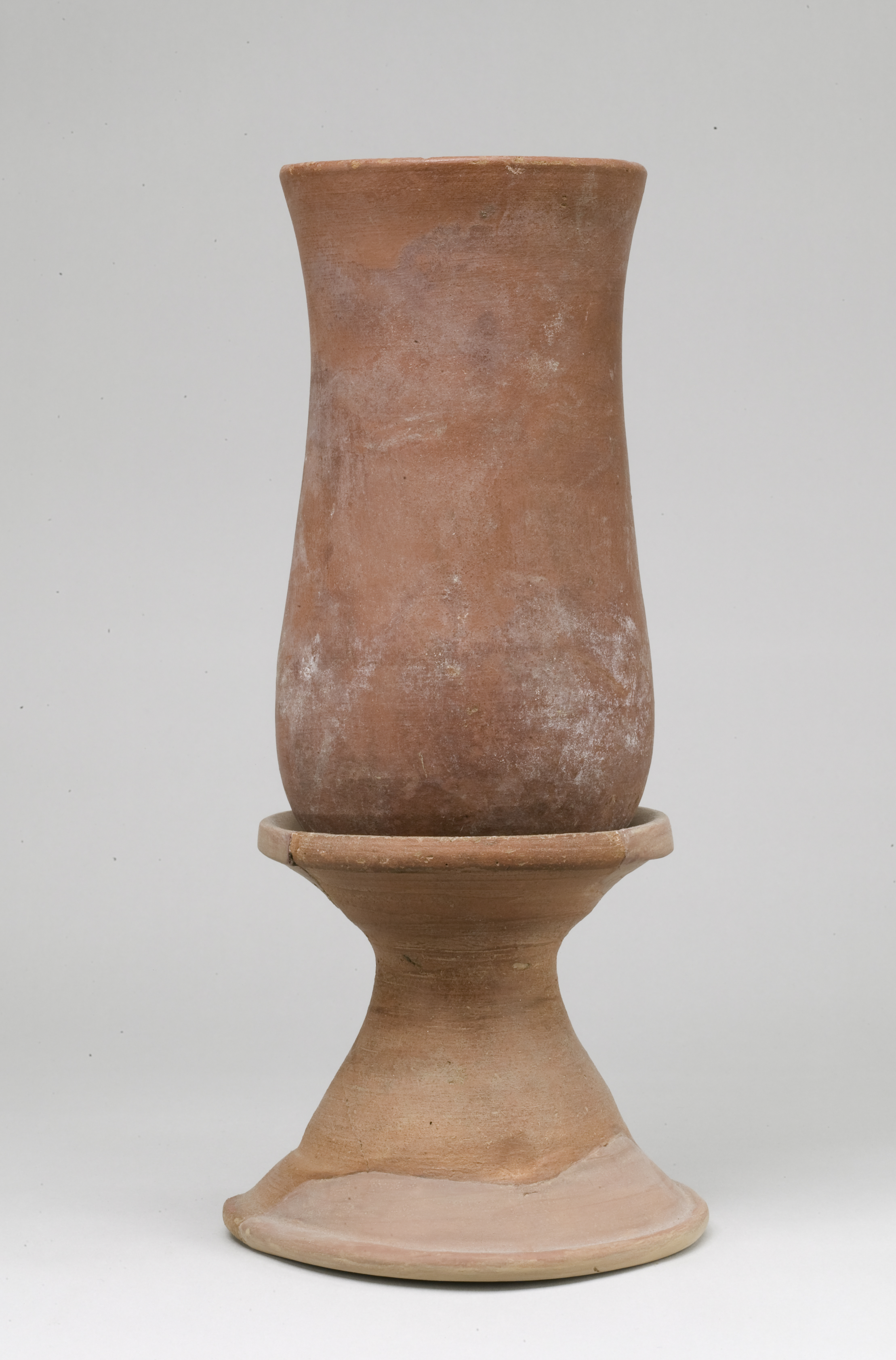
Egyptian "red ware" situla-shaped jar, c 1390–1353 BC, New Kingdom, Dynasty 18, reign of Amenhotep III

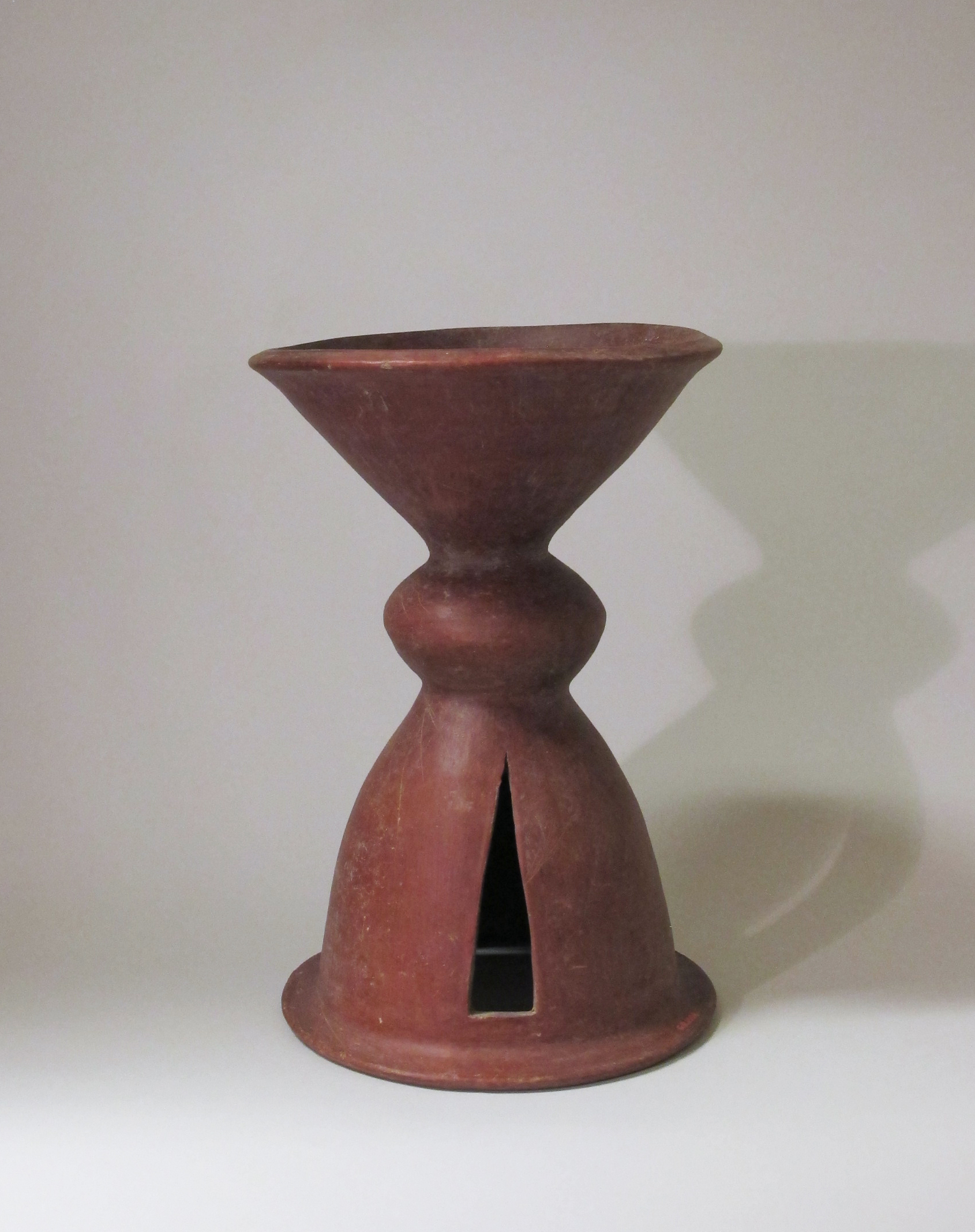
Etruscan red ware stand, 700–650 BC

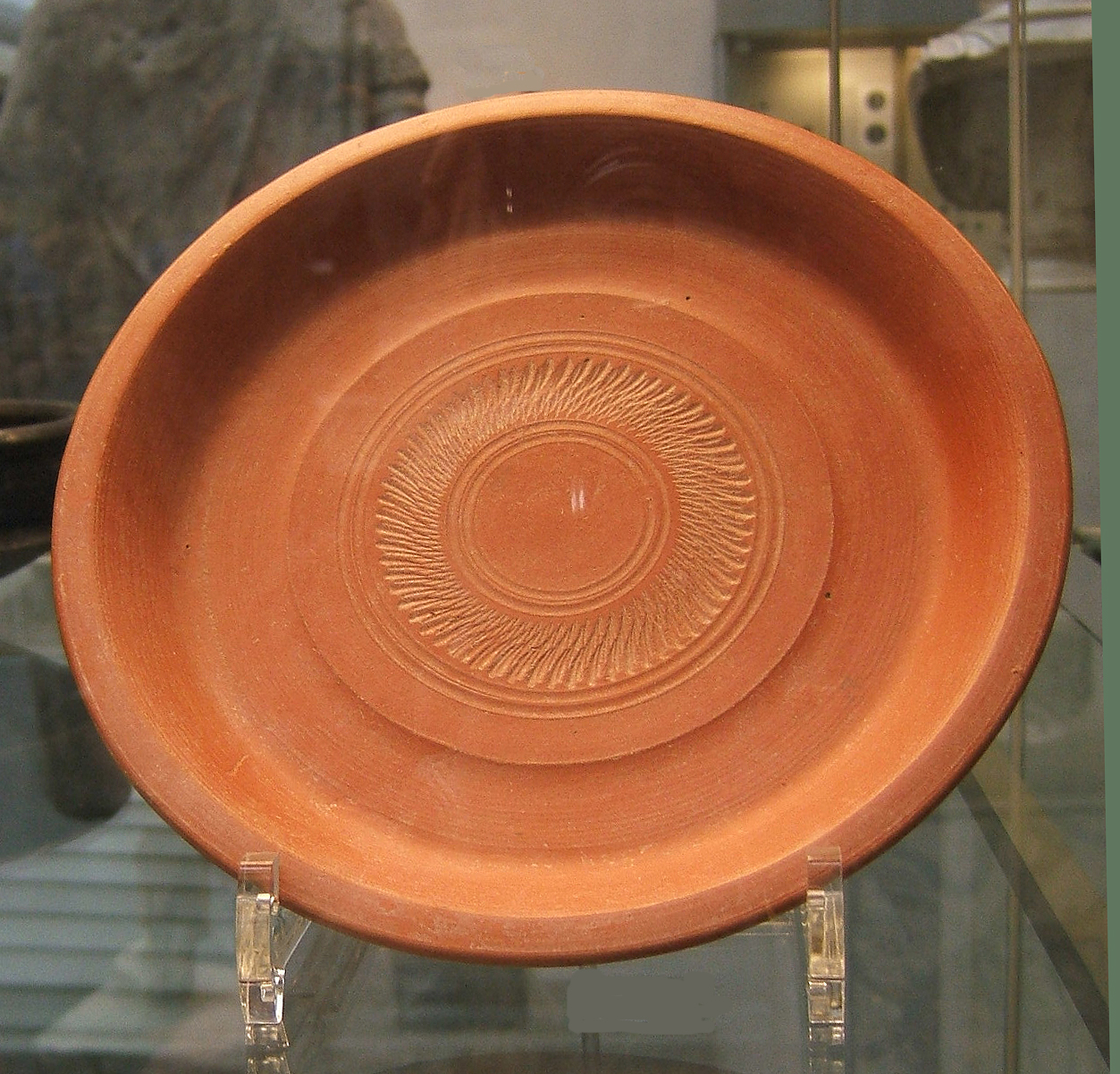
African red slip ware, made in Tunisia, AD 350-400
