= Red Polished Ware =

Red Polished Ware may refer to several types of ancient pottery with a red or terracotta-coloured body:

Egypt

- El-Badari, Egypt c. 5500-4000 BCE

Cyprus

- Pottery of ancient Cyprus, Cyprus c. 2000 BCE
  - Philia culture § Pottery, Cyprus c. 2000 BCE

India

- Red Polished Ware in Gujarat and West & North India c. 300 BCE-1000 CE, continued through Kushan (39-375 CE), Gupta (4th to early 6th century CE) and Vardhan period Pushyabhuti dynasty (early 6th century to 7th century CE) periods such as at Harsh Ka Tila in Haryana
  - Post-period, ie. after early 6th century CE

Ancient Rome

- Terra sigillata § Roman red gloss pottery (Samian/samian ware); not capitalized
- African red slip ware

== See also ==
- Redware - various types of pottery with a red or terracotta-coloured body.
