= Ary de Milde =

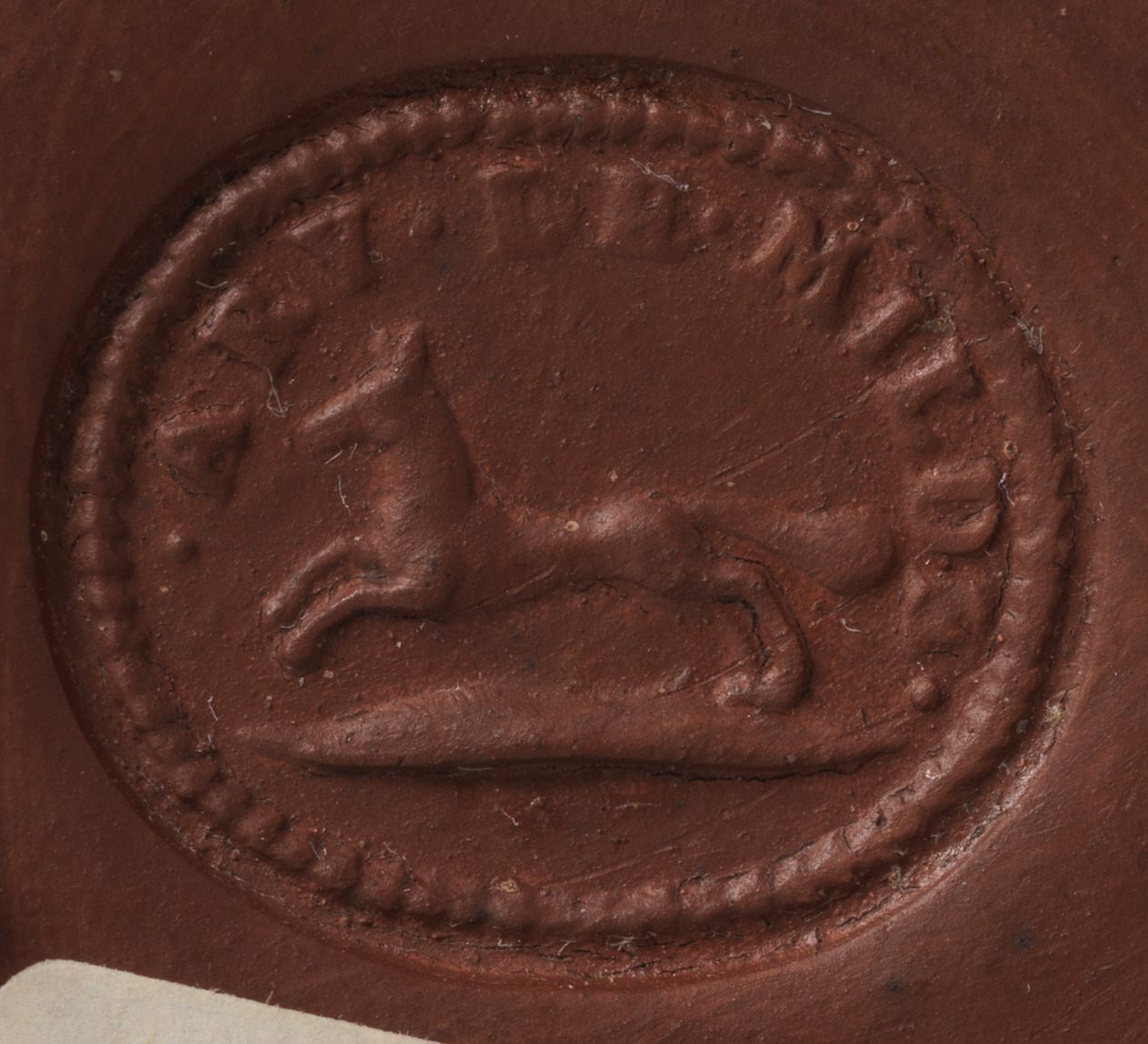
- maker's mark
- Born: 1634; Delft
- Died: 15 January 1708 (aged 73–74); Delft

Ary de Milde (1634 – 1708) was a Dutch Golden Age ceramist in Delft.

Arij or Ary de Milde was born in Delft in 1634 and is known for developing a type of redware imitation teapot that competed with the popular imported Yixing clay teapots. After the war between the Ming Dynasty and the Qing Dynasty in the 1650s the import of Chinese porcelain to the Netherlands through the East India companies was severely reduced and there was an increased market for local ware. Unlike many of his colleagues imitating the Yixing ware, Milde actually stamped the bottom of his teapots with his own maker's mark, a practice that did not become common among the Netherlands ceramists until the 18th century. Milde died in Delft in 1708.

== See also ==
- Elers brothers
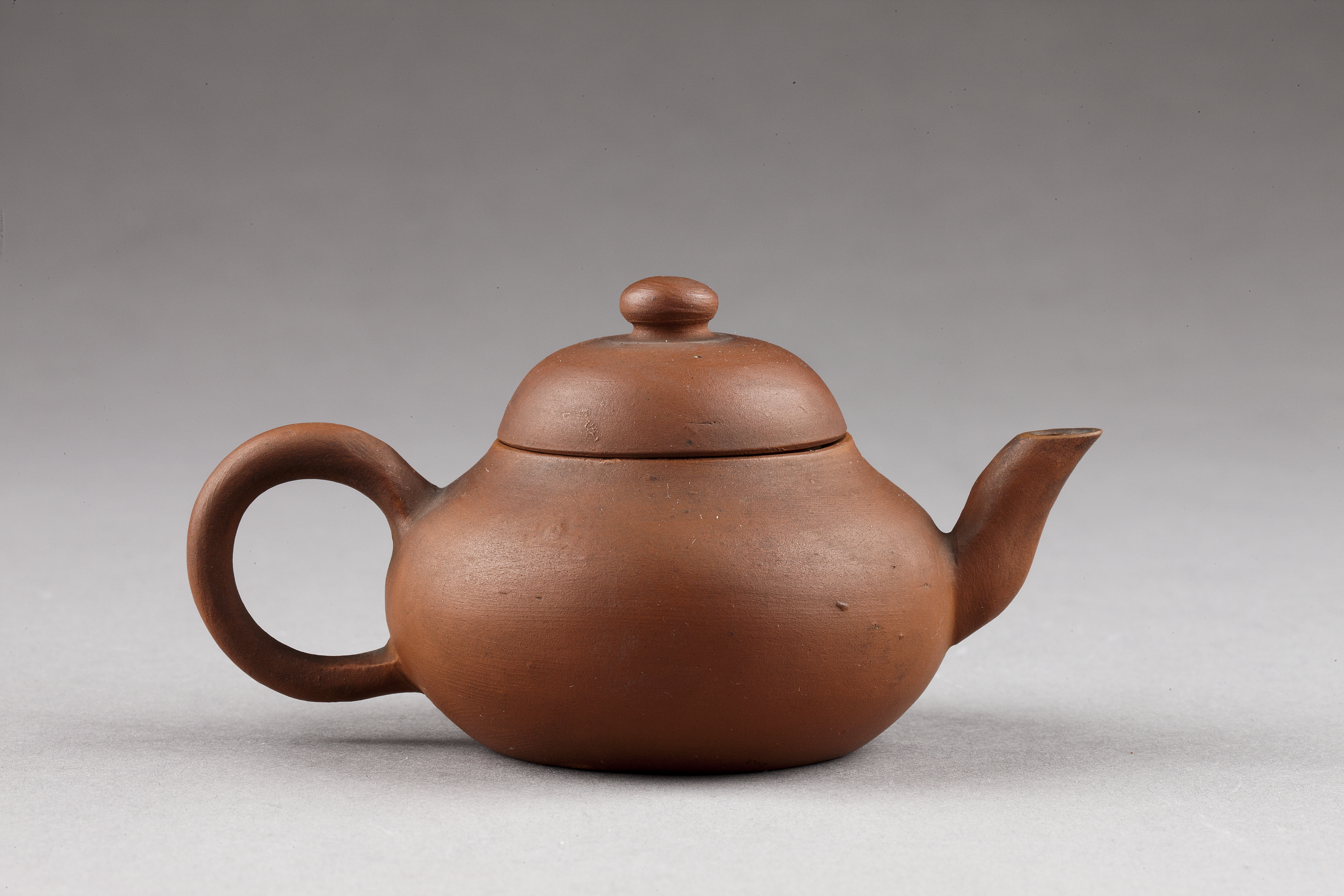
Yixing teapot, Hallwyl Museum

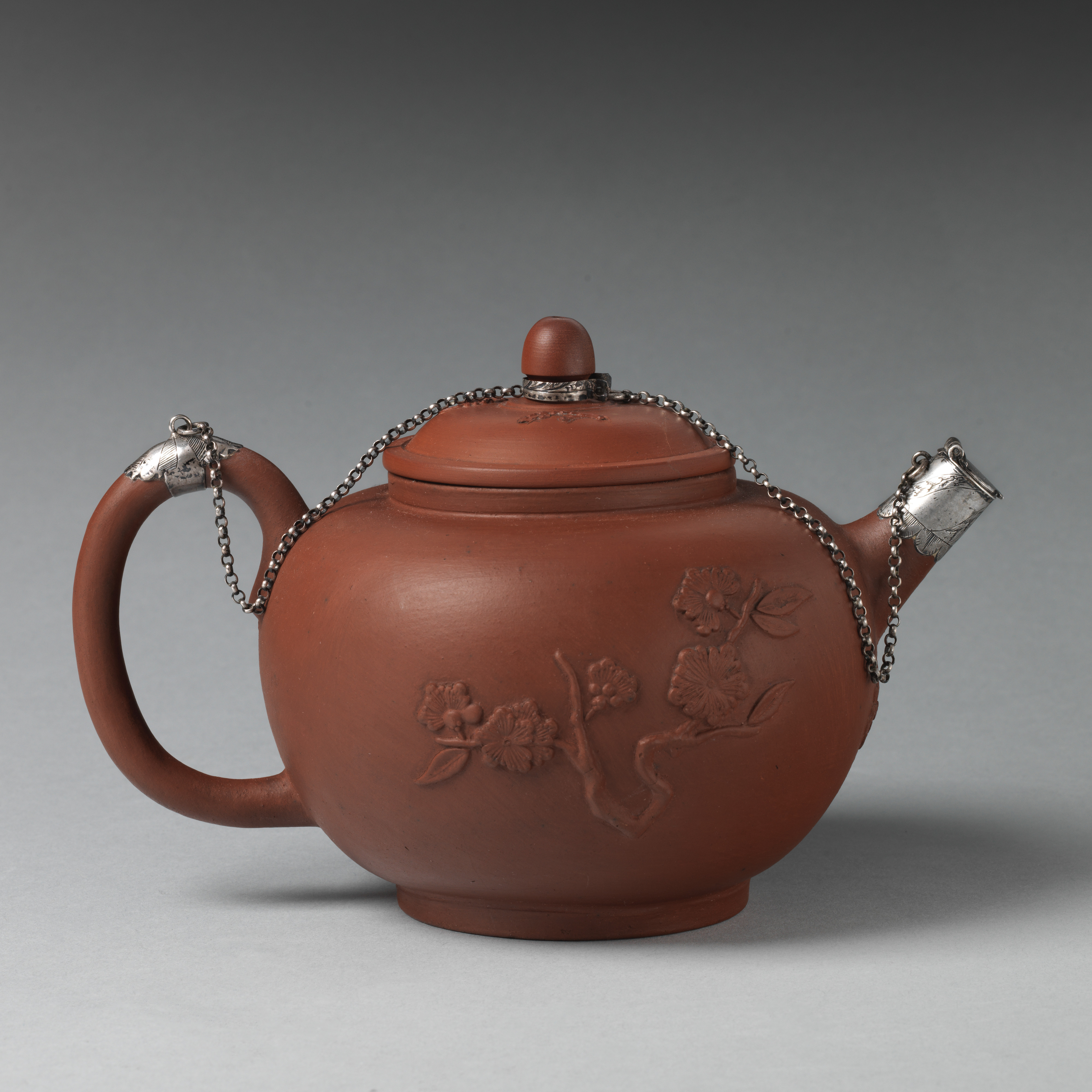
Teapot with silver trim stamped on the bottom by Milde, Metropolitan Museum of Art
