= Nile silt =

Ceramic paste used in Ancient Egyptian pottery

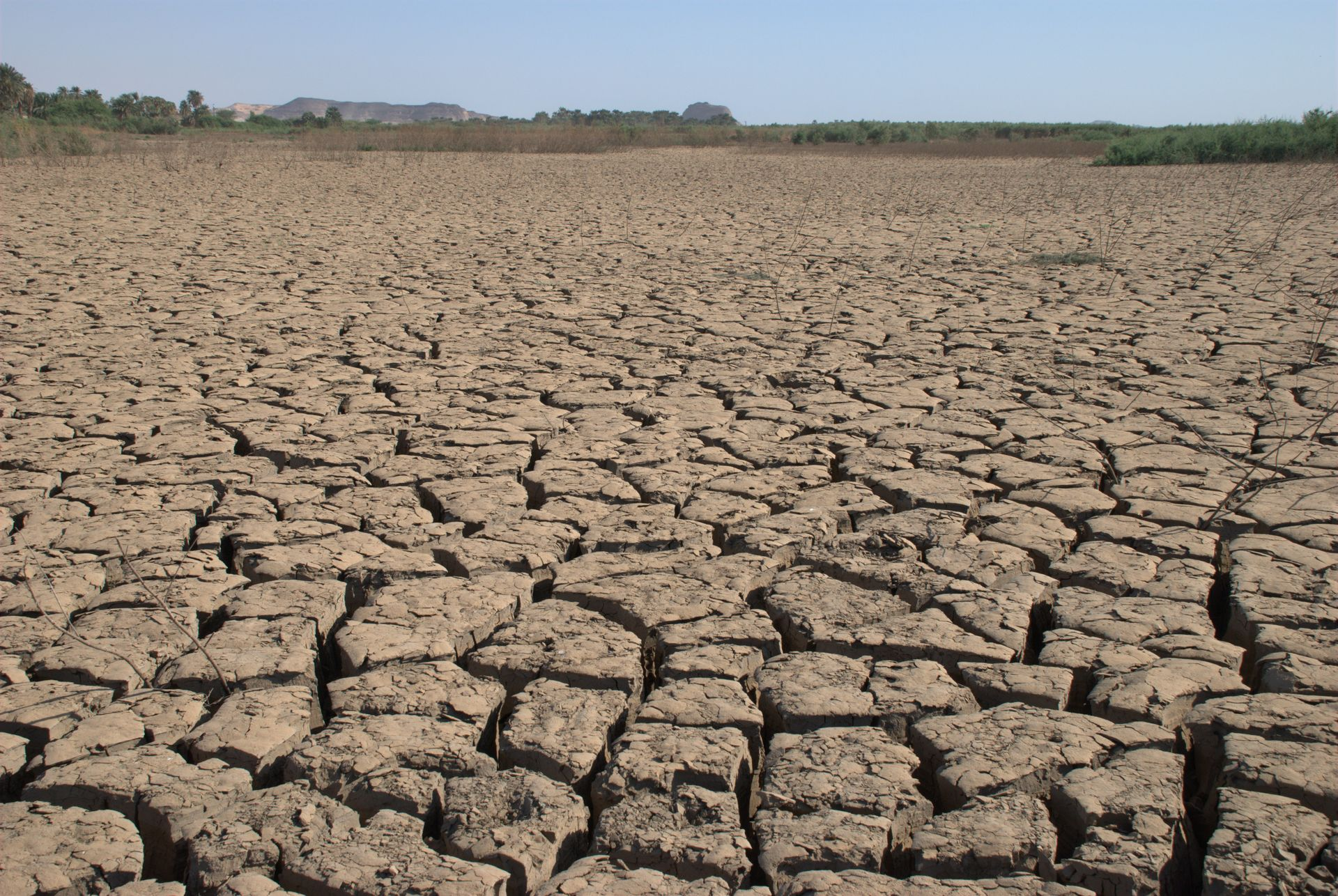
Karima, Nile Silt

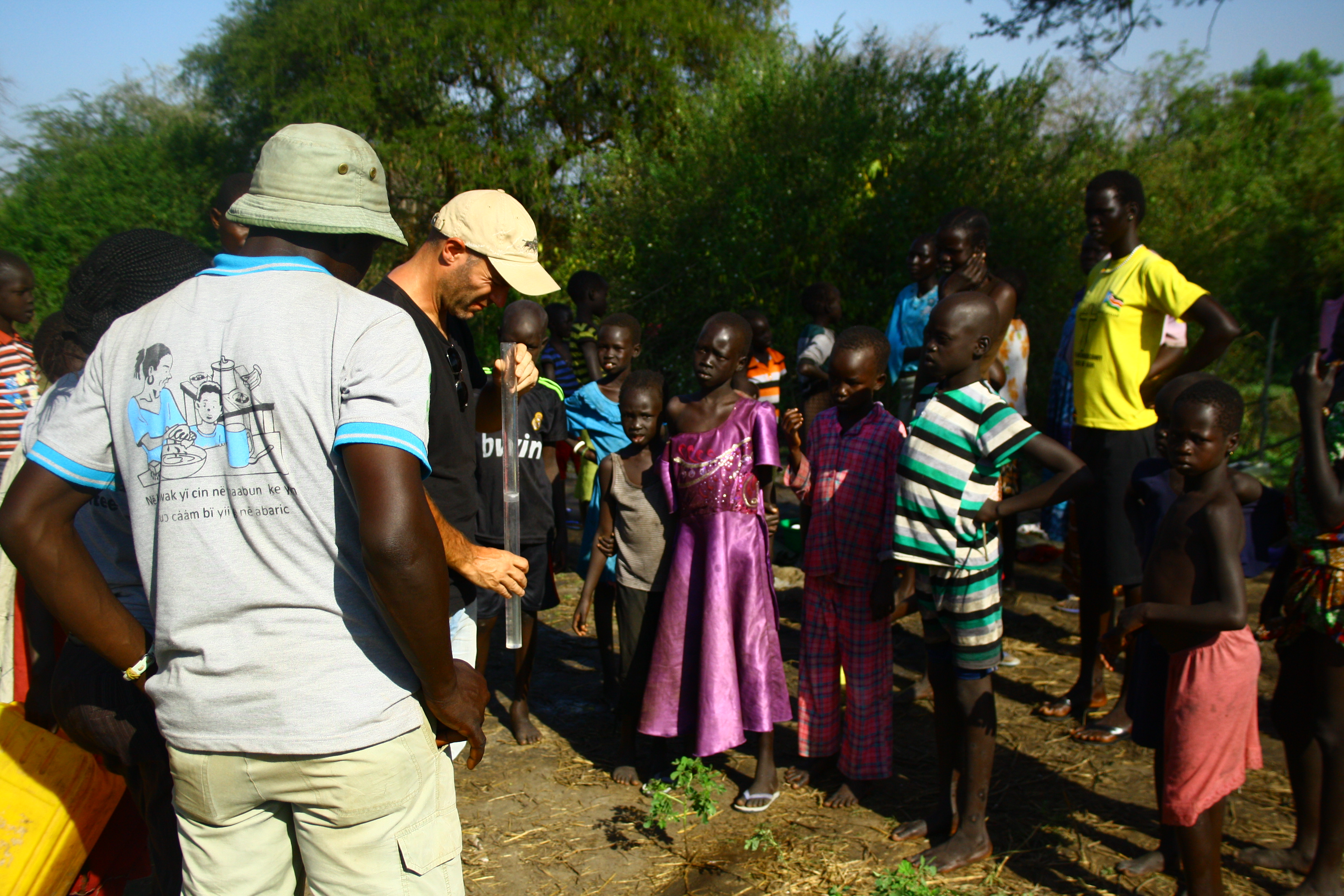
Oxfam and Medicin Sans Frontieres workers check silt levels at a point of the River Nile

Nile silt or Nile mud is a ceramic paste employed widely within Ancient Egyptian pottery manufacture, sourced from local Quaternary Nile sediments.

== Petrography ==
Nile silt is readily identified petrographically, should macroscopic visual examination leave any doubt as to origin or identity. Silt is used to grow better crops for the people that live along the Nile.

The primary features of Nile silt, as revealed by a petrographic microscope, include:

- Composed of poorly sorted sand to silt-sized quartz particles, in widely varying quantities and size range
- A high proportion of accessory and heavy minerals, mainly including opaques and minerals of the mica, amphibole, pyroxene and feldspar groups. Various other minerals (up to 45 mineral species) may also be present.
- Vegetal tissue fragments (i.e. plant remains) and related material (phytoliths) are commonly visible in the clay paste
- A non-calcareous matrix with abundant vegetal material or its remains as phytoliths or voids.
