= Tasian culture =

Egyptian Predynastic culture from c. 4500 BC

- Geographical range: Upper Egypt
- Period: Neolithic
- Dates: ~4,500 BC
- Type site: Deir Tasa
- Characteristics: Contemporary with Badari culture, Merimde culture
- Preceded by: Faiyum A culture
- Followed by: Badari culture, Amratian culture

The Tasian culture is possibly one of the oldest-known Predynastic cultures in Upper Egypt, which evolved around 4500 BC. It is named for the burials found at Deir Tasa, a site on the east bank of the Nile located between Asyut and Akhmim. There is no general agreement about the proposed "Tasian culture", and some scholars since Baumgartel in 1955 have suggested it is a part of the Badarian culture, rather than a separate entity.

The Tasian culture group is notable for producing the earliest black-topped pottery, a type of red and brown pottery which is black-colored on its top and interior. This pottery is vital to the dating of the various predynastic Egyptian civilizations. Since all dates for the Predynastic period are tenuous at best, Flinders Petrie developed a system called Sequence Dating through which the relative date, if not the absolute date, of any given Predynastic site can be ascertained by examining the handles on pottery.

As the Predynastic period in ancient Egypt progressed, the handles on pottery evolved from functional to ornamental, and the degree to which any given archaeological site has functional or ornamental pottery can be used to determine the relative date of the site. Since there is little difference between Tasian and Badarian pottery, the Tasian Culture overlaps the Badarian place on the scale between Sequence Dating 21 and 29 significantly.

Excavations of Tasian burials have yielded a number of skeletons. The fossils are generally taller and more robust than later predynastic Egyptian specimens. In this regard, the Tasian skeletons are most similar to those associated with the Merimde culture. Furthermore, although the Tasian crania are dolichocephalic (long-headed) like many of the other predynastic skulls, they have a large and wide vault like the Merimde crania. Skulls excavated from Badarian, Amratian, and Natufian sites tend instead to be smaller and narrow.

Anthropologist Alain Anselin cited recent archaeological data compiled which had identified Tasian and Badarian Nile Valley sites as peripheral networks of earlier African cultures that featured the movement of Badarian, Saharan, Nubian, and Nilotic populations. Bruce Williams, Egyptologist, has stated "The Tasian Period is significantly related to the Neolithic of Sudanese-Saharan tradition as found just north of Khartoum and near Dongola in Sudan".

British Africanist, Basil Davidson, (1995) observed that the earliest southern Egyptian farmers, Tasian and Badarian communities, were close neighbours of the Middle Nile and would have emerged from regions south-west or west of the Nile territories. In his view, the early Egyptians belonged to wide communities that lived between the Red Sea and the Atlantic Ocean, shared a common 'Saharan-Sudanese culture' and drew their reinforcements from this source whilst absorbing a number of wanderers from the Near East over time.

Tasians were shown to have dental traits similar to Sub-Saharan Africans and some also to North Africans. According to the researchers, it is possible that the population may have been a mix of both groups, but the sample size was concluded to be too small to make definitive statements.

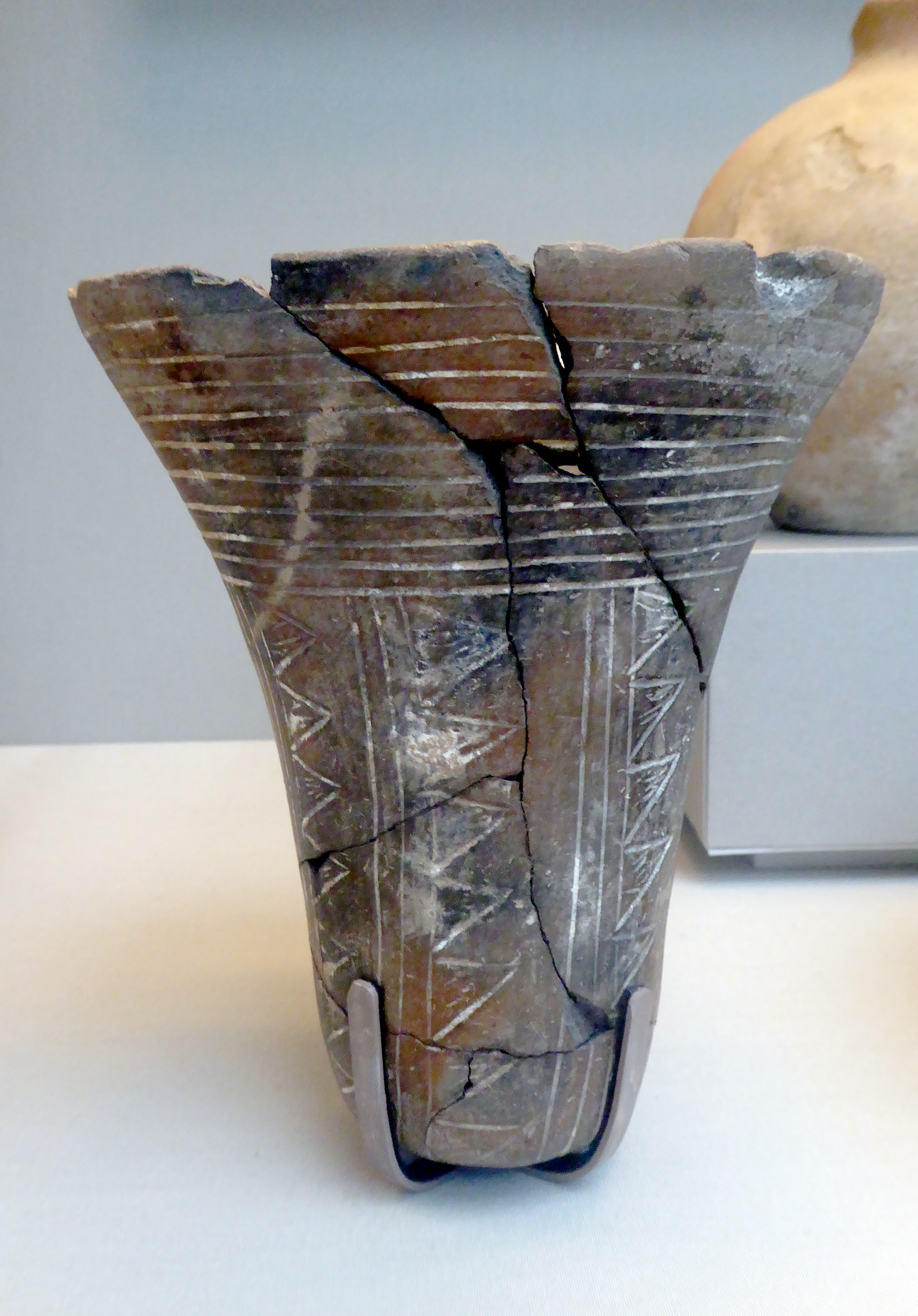
Tasian beaker, found in a Badarian grave at Qau; tomb 569, around 4000 BC; Upper Egypt; British Museum.
