= Naqada culture =

Prehistoric Egyptian culture

Coordinates: 25°57′00″N 32°44′00″E

- Extent of Naqada I culture
- Geographical range: Egypt
- Period: Neolithic
- Dates: c. 4000–3000 BC
- Type site: Naqada
- Preceded by: Badarian culture
- Followed by: First Dynasty of Egypt

The Naqada culture is an archaeological culture of Chalcolithic Predynastic Egypt (c. 4000–3000 BC), named for the town of Naqada, Qena Governorate. A 2013 Oxford University radiocarbon dating study of the Predynastic period suggests a beginning date sometime between 3,800 and 3,700 BC, and end circa 3,100 BC, going through the three periods of Naqada I, Naqada II and Naqada III.

"Naqada" (Nubt) literally means "Golden Town", reflecting the exceptional wealth of the eastern desert region in gold, and the strategic position of Naqada and its facing town of Koptos for the commerce of that gold. The exploitation of precious metals from the Eastern Desert, and the development of floodplain agriculture creating surpluses which could generate demand for a variety of crafts, made the region especially advanced in term of economic specialization and diversification, much more advanced than the regions of contemporary Lower Egypt.

Established scholarship have identified a common African substratum for the formation of early Egypt which included the Naqada cultural practices. Older studies have found Central African tool designs in the Badarian and Naqada archaeological sites. According to archaeologist, Charles Thurstan Shaw, "the early cultures of Merimde, Badari, Naqadi I and II are essentially African and early African social customs and religious beliefs were the root and foundation of Egyptian way of life."

The final phase of the Naqada culture is Naqada III, which is coterminous with the Protodynastic Period (Early Bronze Age c. 3200–3000 BC) in ancient Egypt.

== Chronology ==
=== William Flinders Petrie ===
The Naqada period was first divided by the British Egyptologist William Matthew Flinders Petrie, who explored the site in 1894, into three sub-periods:

- Naqada I: Amratian (after the cemetery near El-Amrah, Egypt, Sequence Dates SD 31–37)
- Naqada II: Gerzean (after the cemetery near Gerzeh, Sequence Dates SD 38–62)
- Naqada III: Semainean (after the cemetery near Es-Semaina, Sequence Dates SD 63–76)

=== Werner Kaiser ===
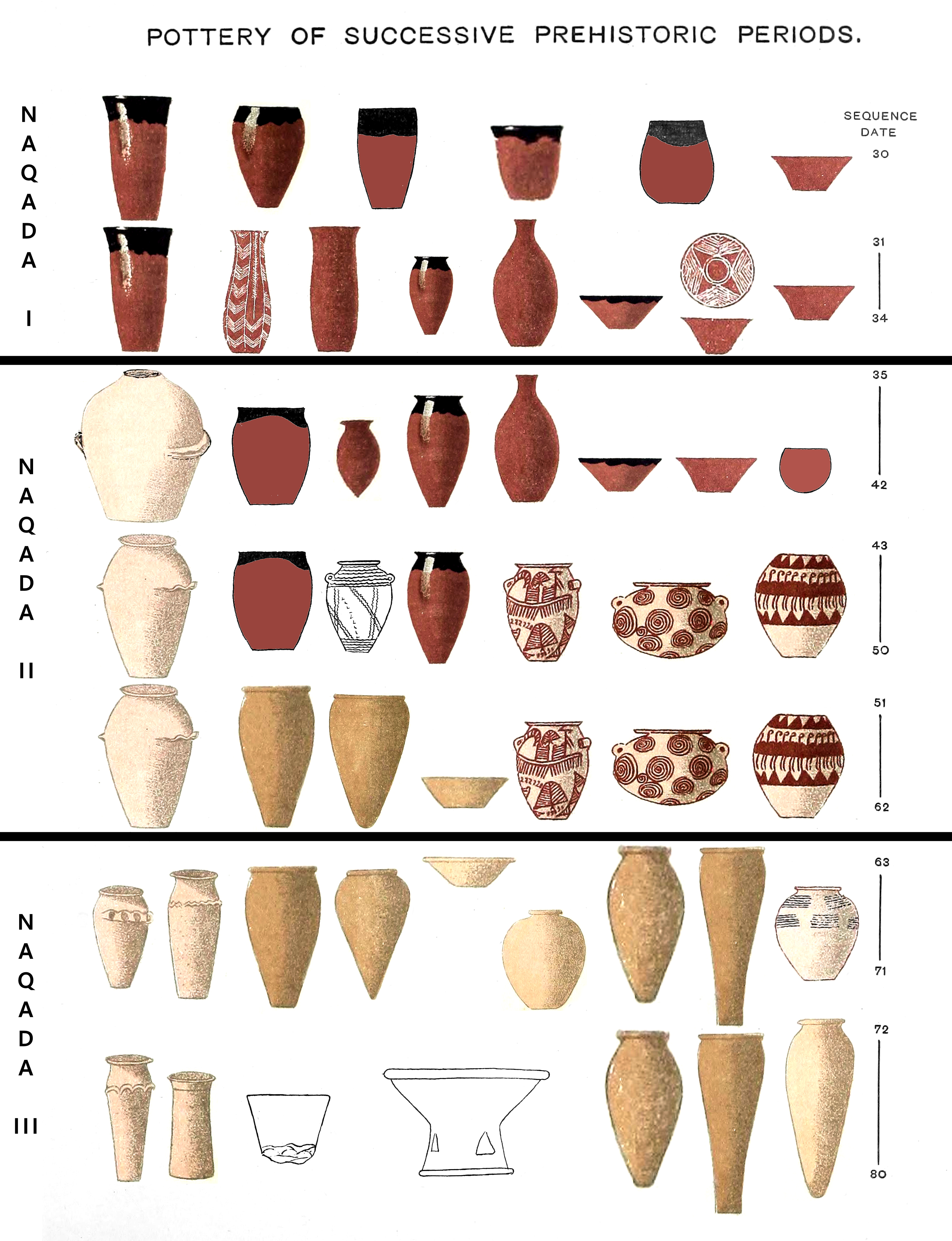
Evolution of Egyptian prehistoric pottery styles, from Naqada I to Naqada II and Naqada III

Petrie's chronology was superseded by that of Werner Kaiser in 1957. Kaiser's chronology began c. 4000 BC, but the modern version has been adjusted slightly, as follows:

- Naqada I (about 3900–3650 BC)
  - black-topped and painted pottery
  - trade with Nubia, Western Desert oases, and Eastern Mediterranean
  - obsidian from Ethiopia
- Naqada II (about 3650–3300 BC)
  - represented throughout Egypt
  - first marl pottery, and metalworking
- Naqada III (about 3300–2900 BC)
  - more elaborate grave goods, first Pharaohs
  - cylindrical jars
  - writing
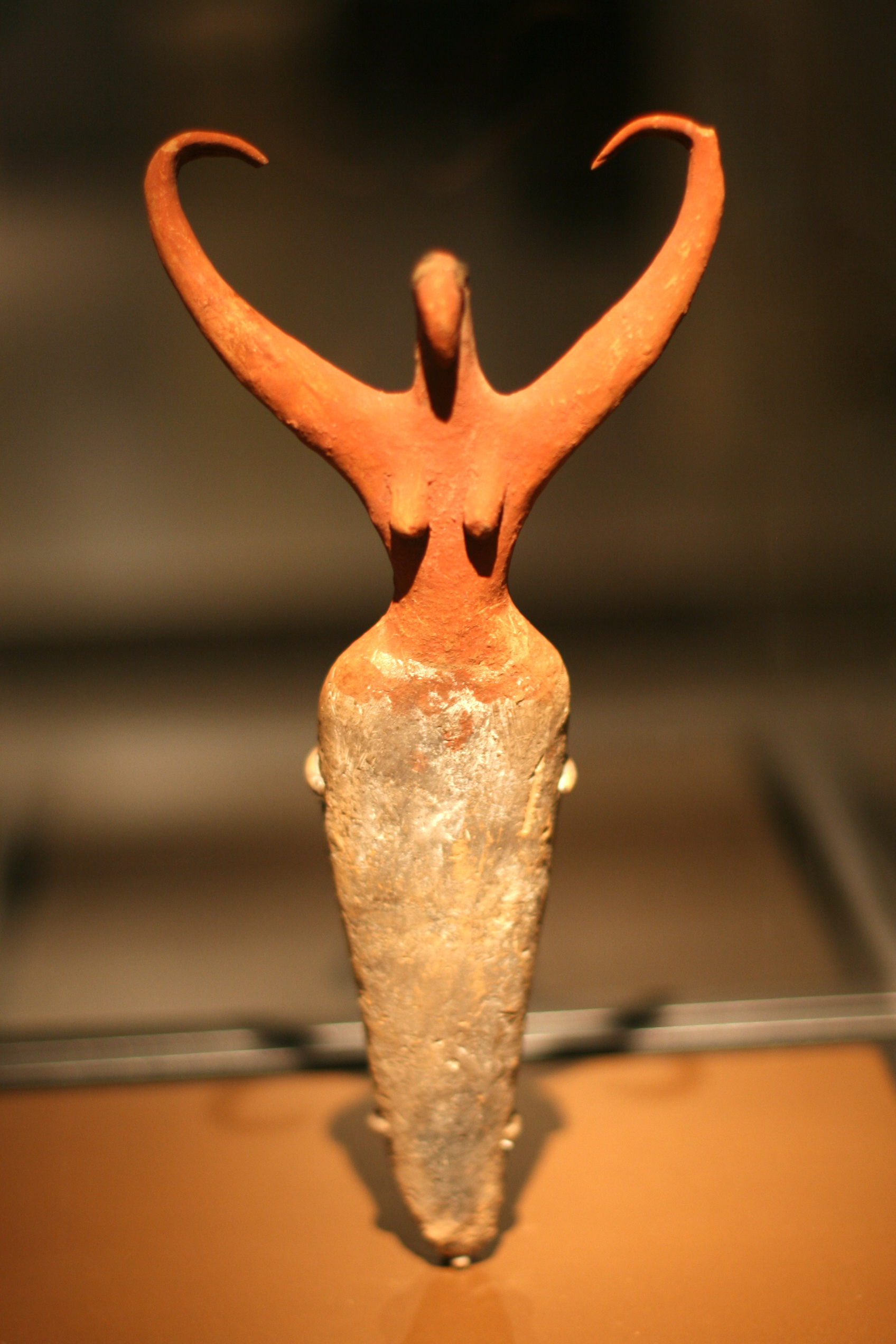
Figure of a woman. Naqada II period, 3500–3400 BCE. Brooklyn Museum

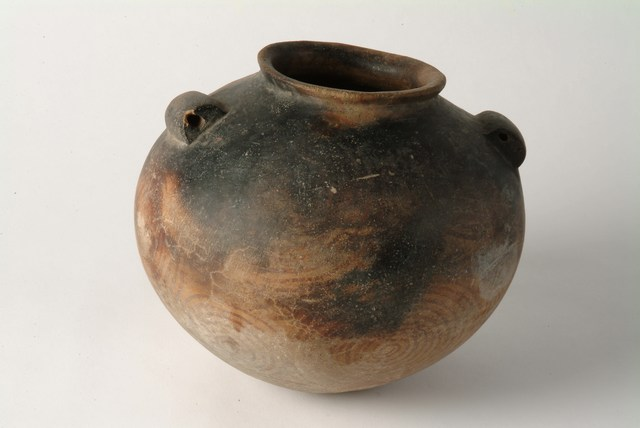
Pre-dynastic Naqada cooking pot - scientific analysis has shown that this pot once contained a meat stew with honey

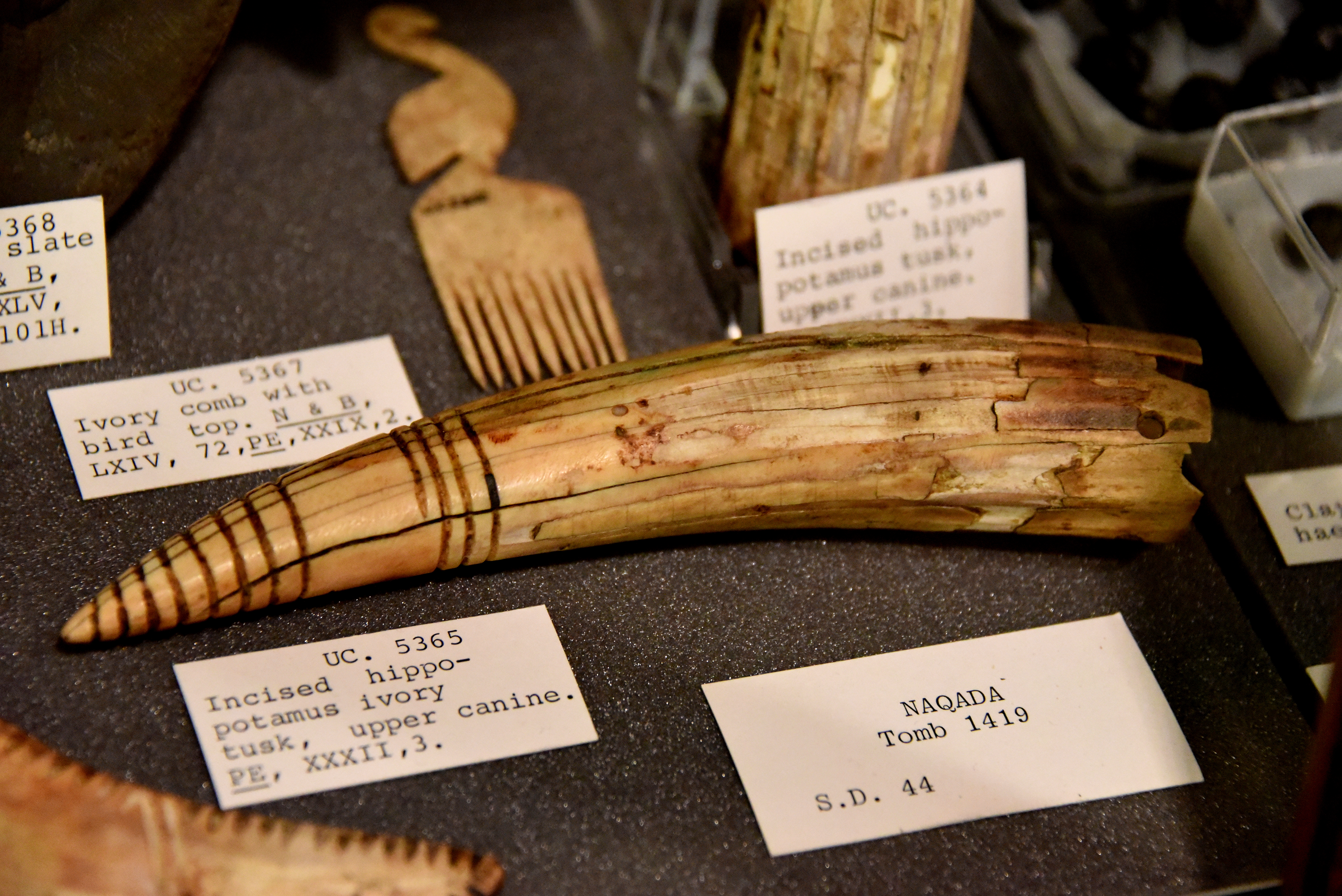
Incised hippopotamus ivory tusk, an upper canine with four holes around top, from Naqada Tomb 1419, Egypt, Naqada period, The Petrie Museum of Egyptian Archaeology, London

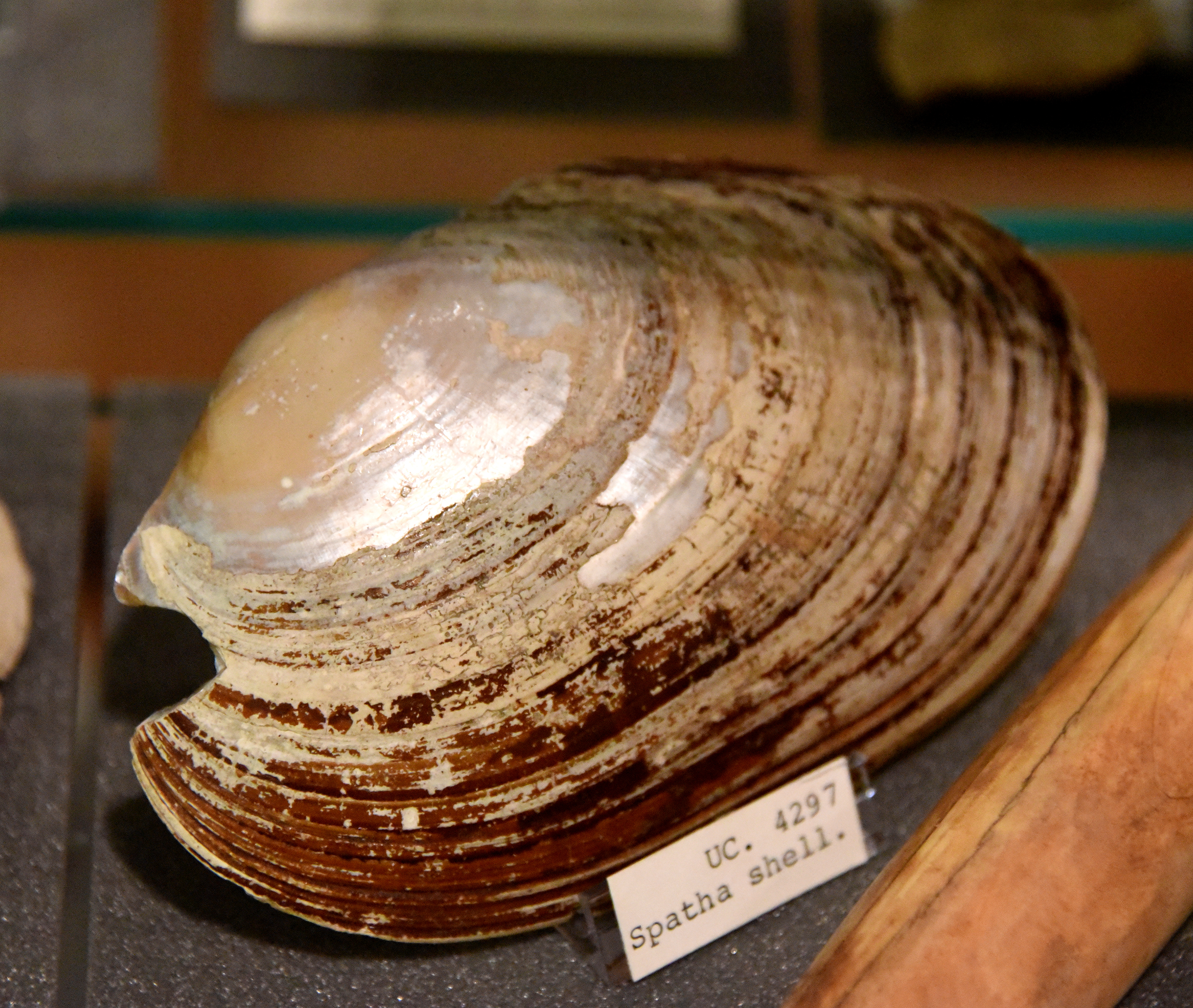
"Spatha" shell (Aspatharia, a freshwater mussel) from Naqada tomb 1539, Egypt, Naqada I period, The Petrie Museum of Egyptian Archaeology, London

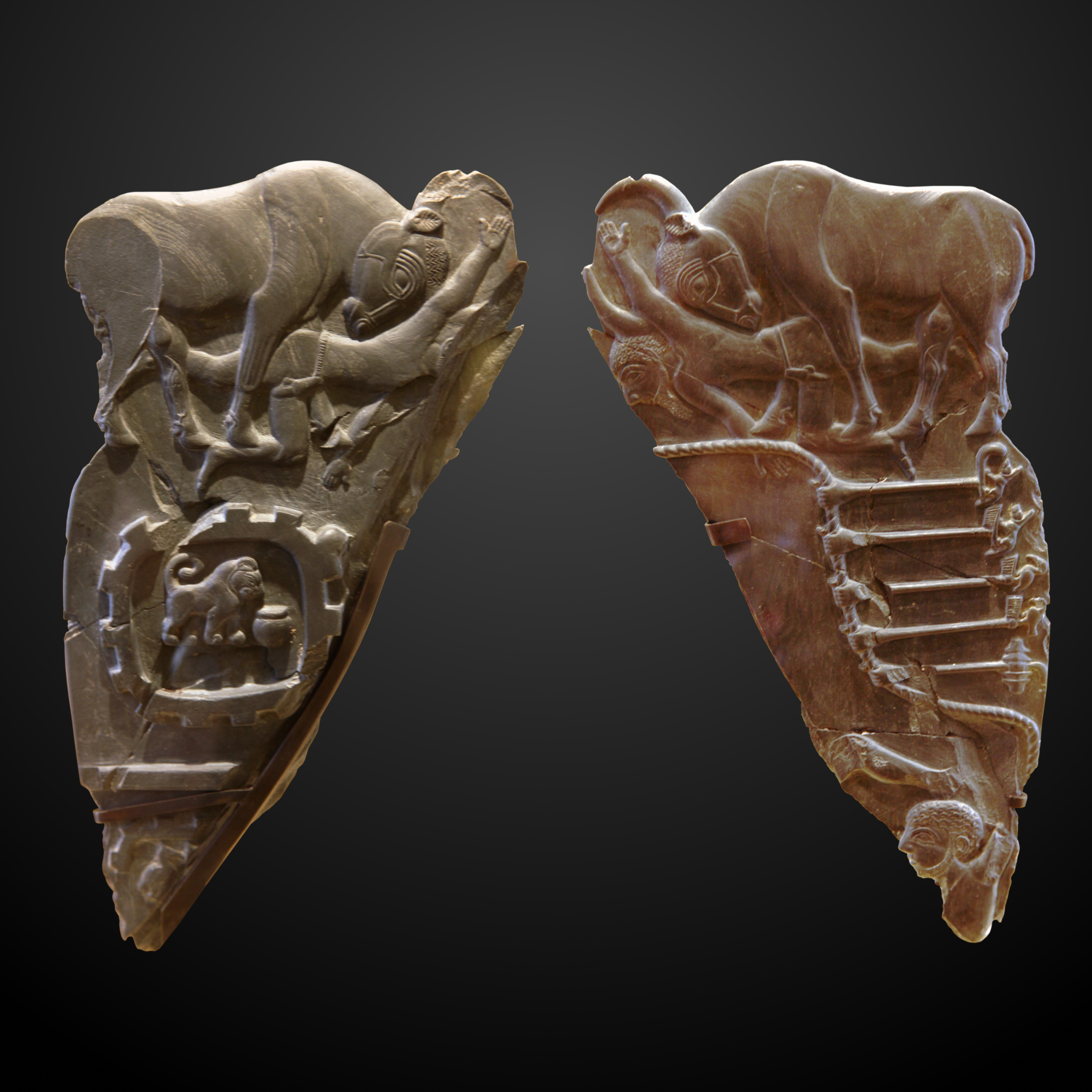
Bull Palette

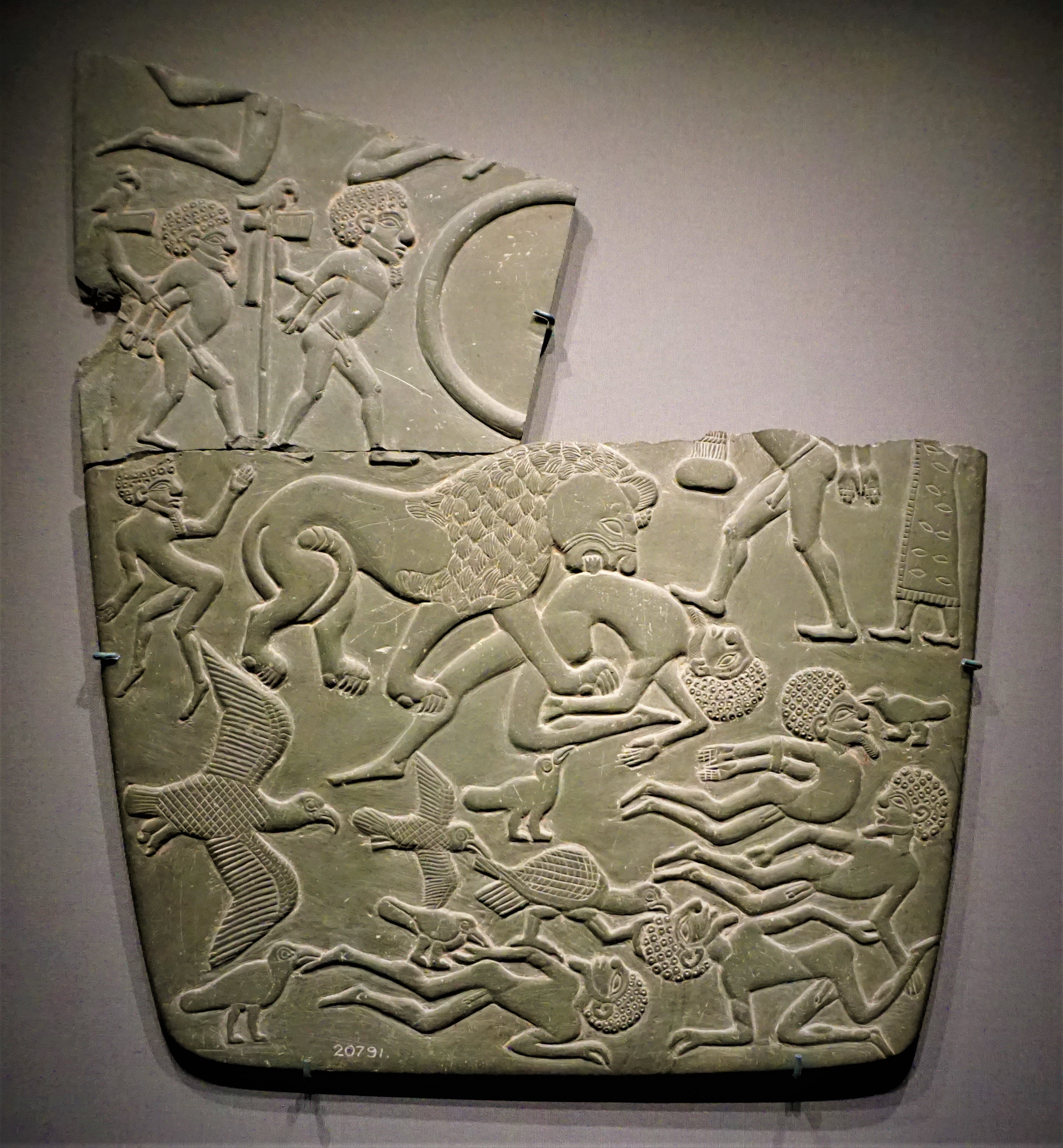
The Battlefield Palette, 3100 B.C.

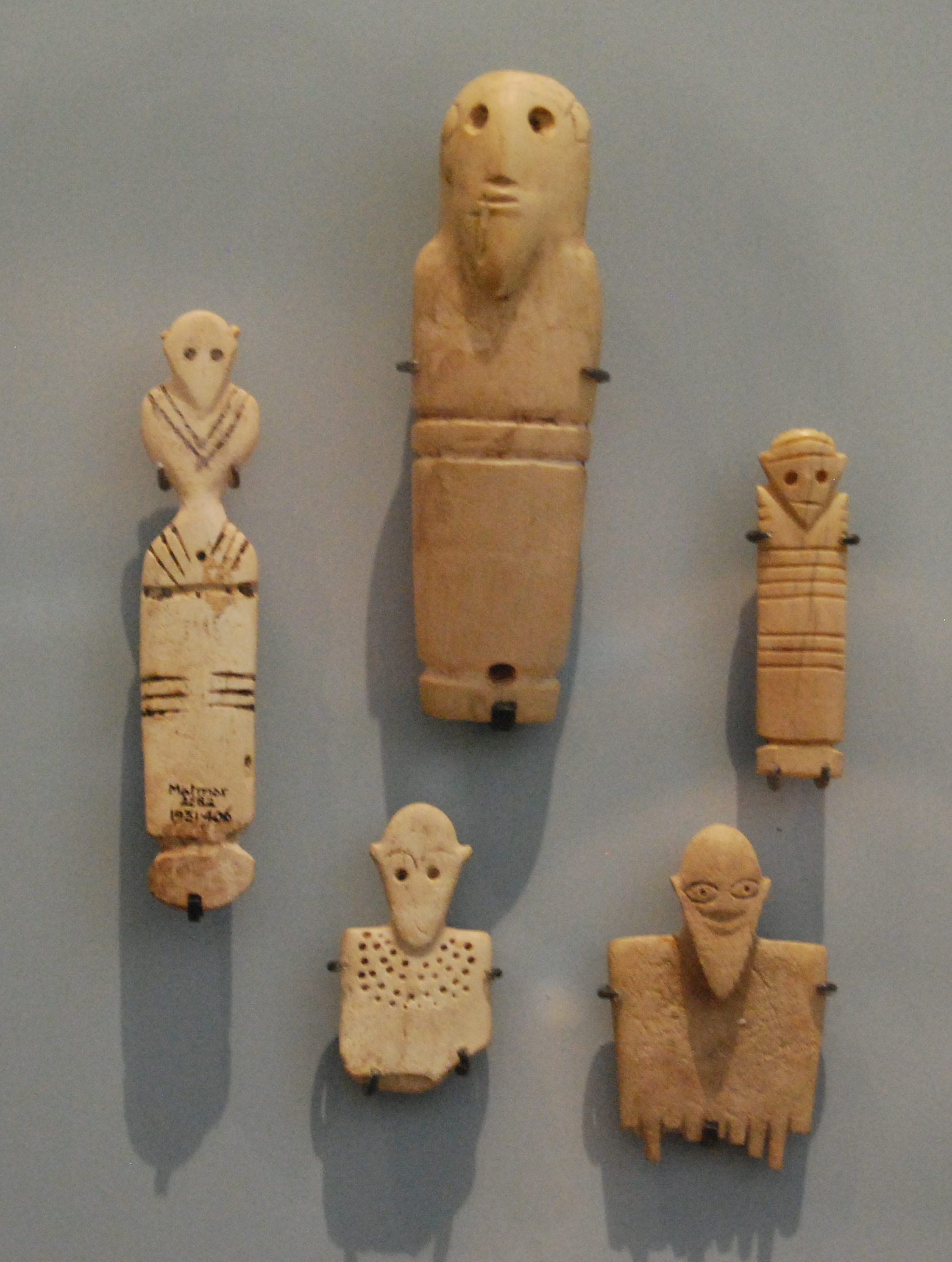
Predynastic human figures, Naqada.

== Monuments and excavations ==
The material culture at Naqada sites varies depending on the phase of Naqada culture. The excavation of pottery at most Naqada sites with each distinct periods of culture having their own defining pottery. The types of pottery that were found at Naqada sites ranges from bowls, small jars, bottles, medium-sized neck jars to wine jars and wavy-handled jars. Most of the pottery excavated from Naqada sites was probably used for cultural purposes (when having decorations on them) and for storage of food.

Many of the designs seen on pottery contain waves, sometimes accompanied by floral motifs or drawings of people, suggesting the importance of art in the Naqada Cultures. These designs may have also had early Mesopotamian influence, as some of the animals depicted on pottery during the Naqada II period are griffins and serpopards (serpent-necked panthers), which are linked to early Uruk period pottery.

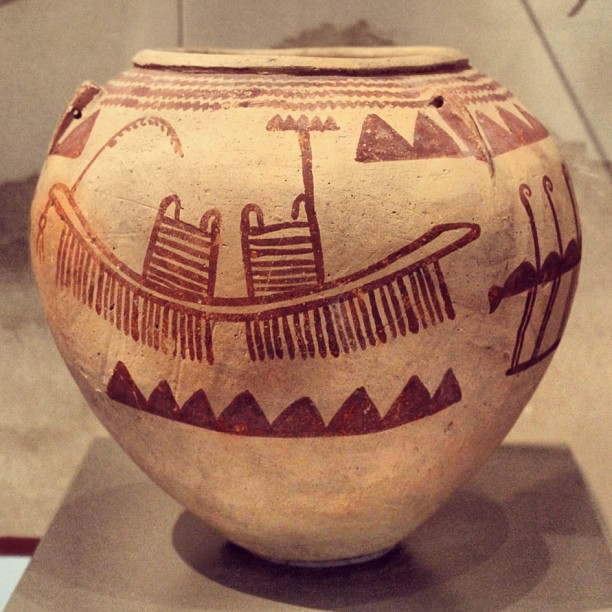
Naqada D-ware jar

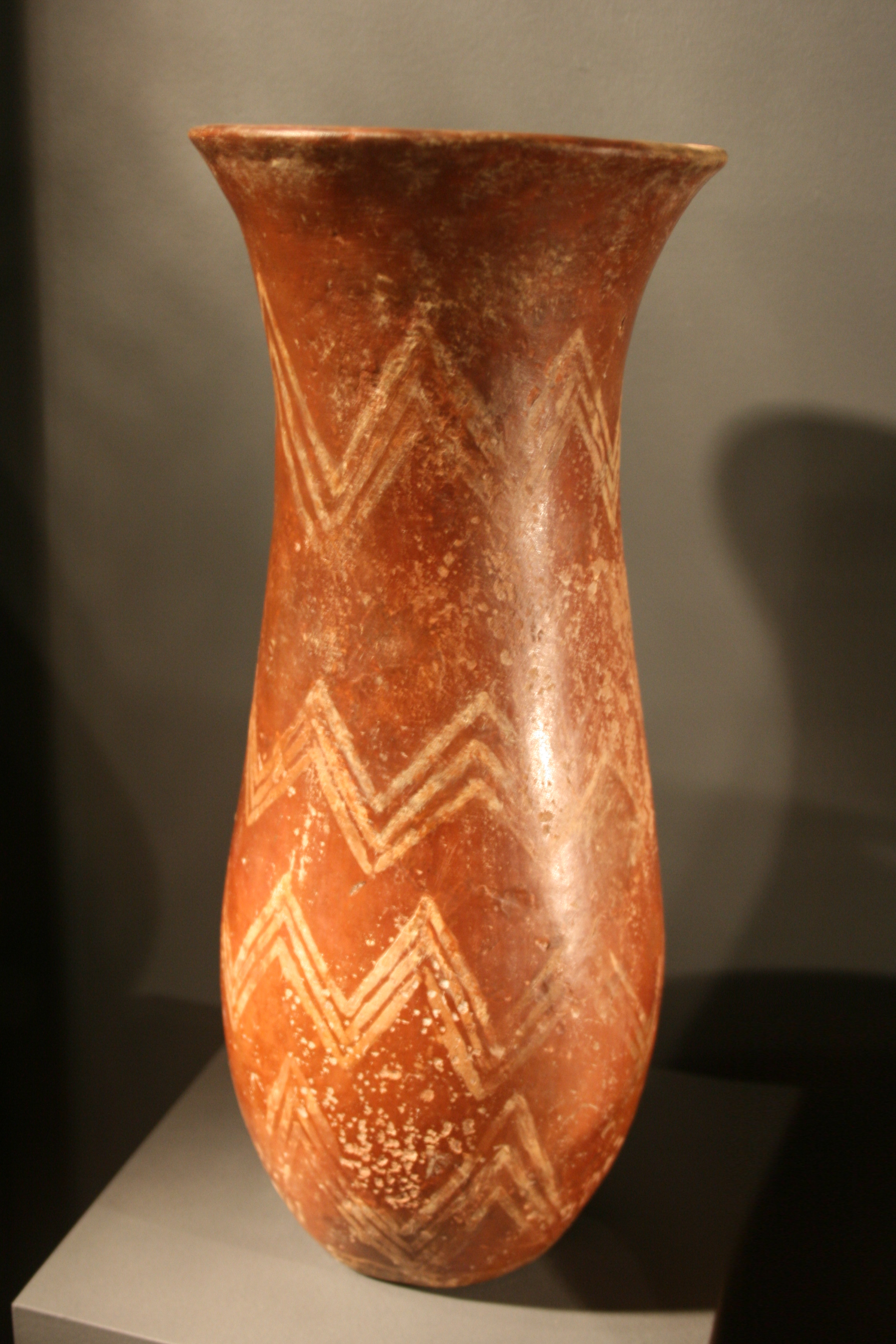
Vase of the Amratian culture, also called Naqada I

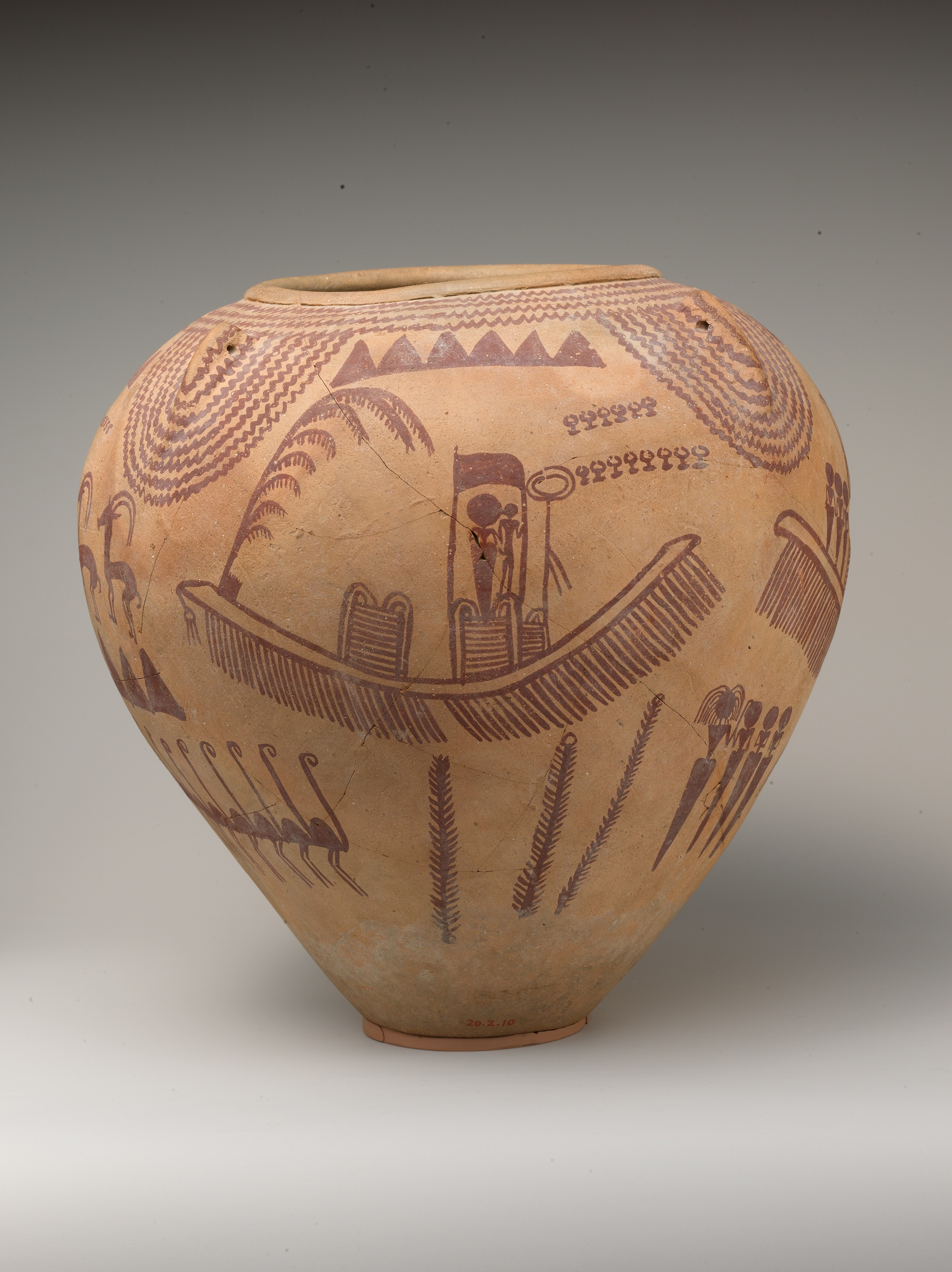
Jar, late Naqada II (3500–3330 BCE), in the New York Metropolitan Museum of Art

There is evidence that copper harpoons had been manufactured at various Naqada III sites such as Tell el-Farkha and Tel El-Murra. Copper harpoons in Naqada society were primarily used for hunting Nile fauna such as the hippopotamus. Hunting the hippopotamus is noted to be important among the Naqada upper class as it was regarded as high social status although access to copper was more open to the elites rather than the common folk. Harpoons themselves were likely used for protection of trade as evident from an Ancient Egyptian port that signaled that it was used by trade caravans as protection. Another use of the harpoon was in art as the symbolism of the harpoon was probably used for religious purposes as possibly referencing a magic-like hunt using these weapons. The small figurines that are found at Naqada type sites are usually made out of materials such as stones and Ivory. They may have been made for everyday use such as children toys or for ritualistic purpose such as for medicine and magic. The figurines may have also had a religious aspect as it is speculated that some figurines were made to be worshiped as fertility idols and to help with farm productivity. The small figurines may have also been used in mortuary and burial rituals as excavated figurines at Naqada sites have been found close to bodies, suggesting that the figurines may have been used in these rituals.

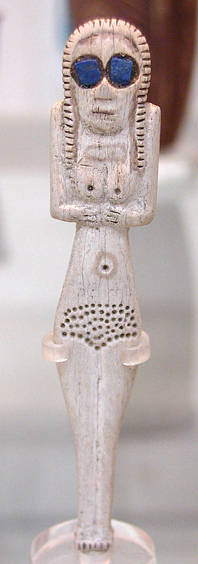
Naqada bone figure of a woman. British Museum

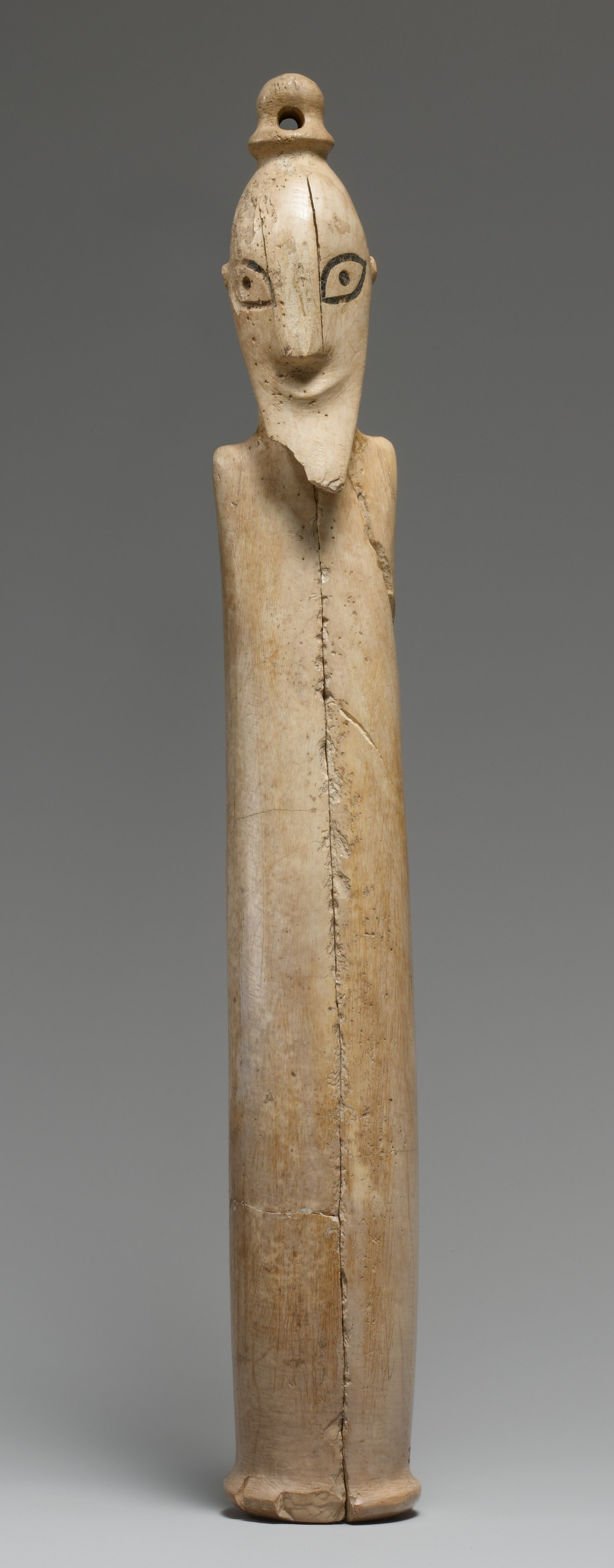
Tusk figurine of a man, late Naqada I. Metropolitan Museum of Art

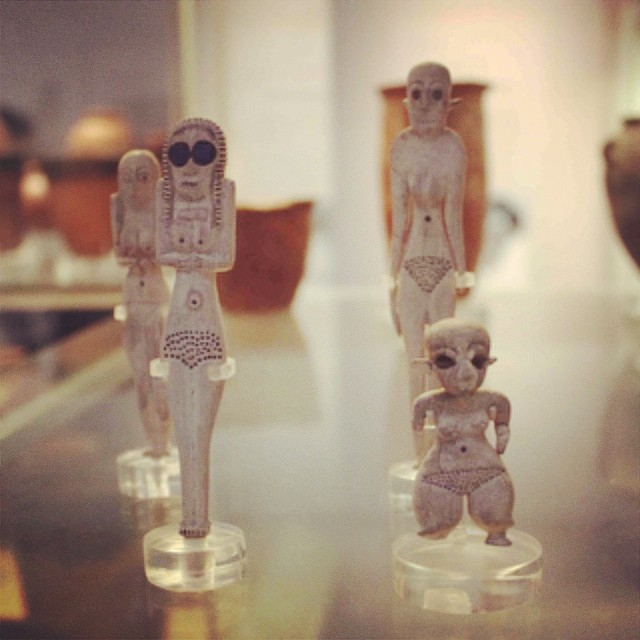
Figurines of bone and ivory. Naqada I. 4000–3600 BC

Knives and knife handles were common in Naqada culture. There seems to be a distinct tradition of knife: the twisted-knife tradition which started in Northern/Lower Egypt and made its way into upper Egypt combining Northern and Southern knife manufacturing styles. The knives that were found during this period appeared to be made out of flint. Knife handles that are dated back to the Naqada II period show intricate work on knife handles as designs of humans worshiping and scenes from nature in Egypt are shown on these knife handles. The knives that were used in Naqada society were used for everyday use such as for cutting food and for hunting and ritualistic purposes. Due to the artwork on some of the knife handles, it can be inferred that knives with designed handles on them were reserved for the upper elites of society.

Early forms of Egyptian writing appear in the Naqada culture. Writing itself appears around the Naqada II period and the forms that it took were in the forms of pictograms. There are several artifacts that depict writing on them. Mostly these are found on vessels and the writing usually depicts animals and people and was used to document trade and administrative transactions. With writing being central around the elites, early writing was used more for documentation of royalty more than everyday life in Naqada culture as seen in early dynastic and predynastic Egypt.

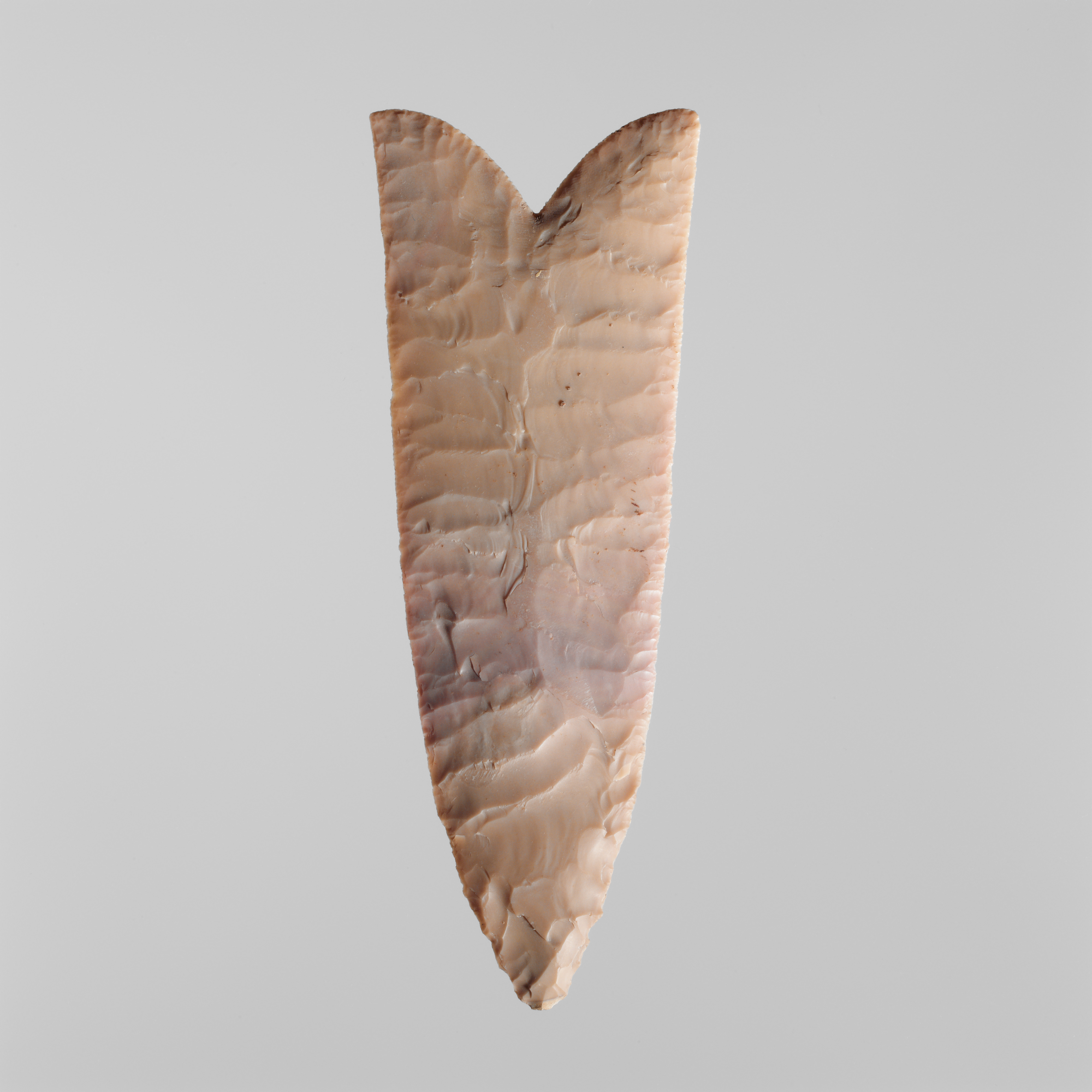
Fishtail knife dated to Naqada II period. Metropolitan Museum of Art

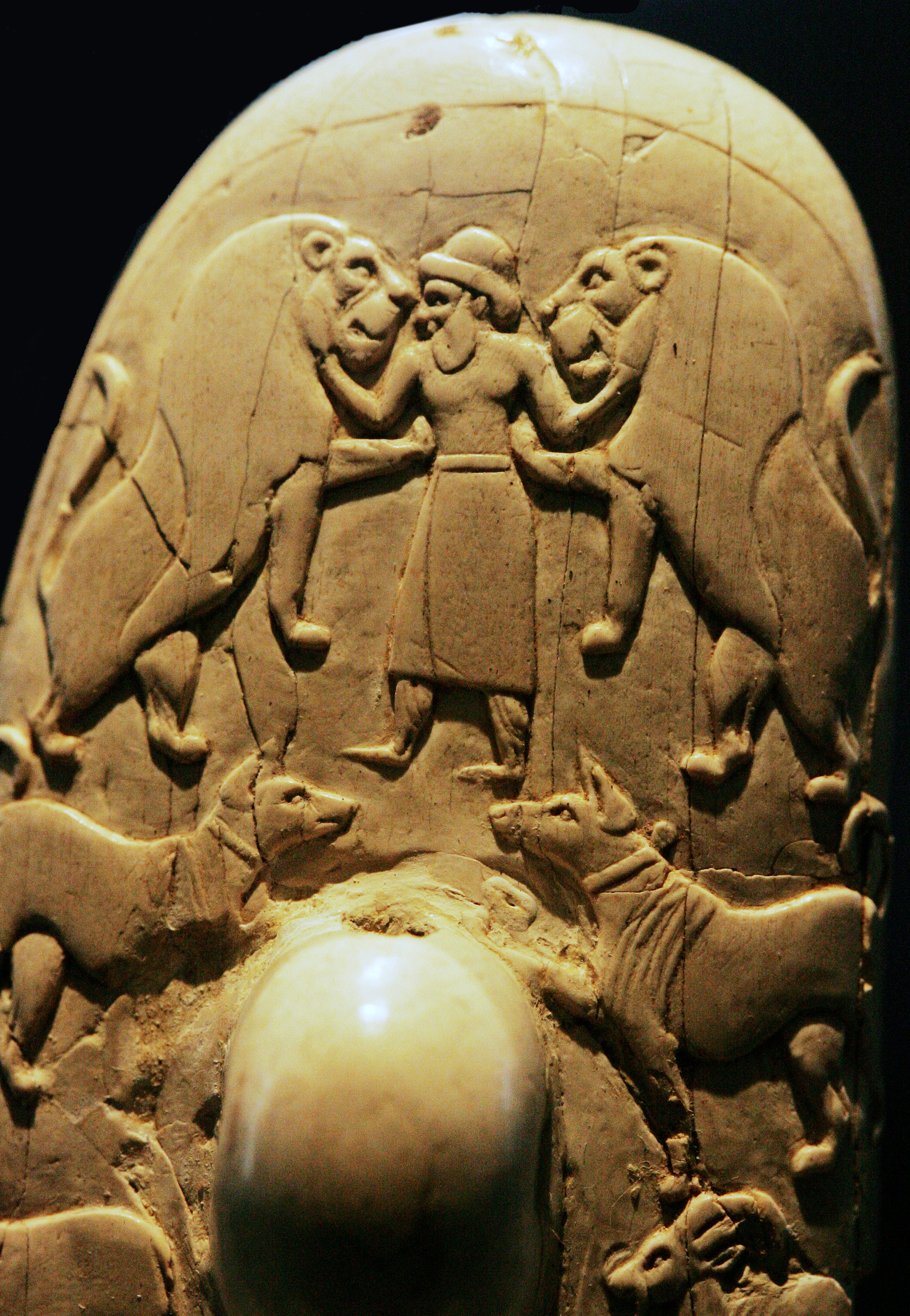
The Gebel el-Arak Knife. The reverse of the handle shows a Master of Animals motif: two confronted lions, flanking a central figure

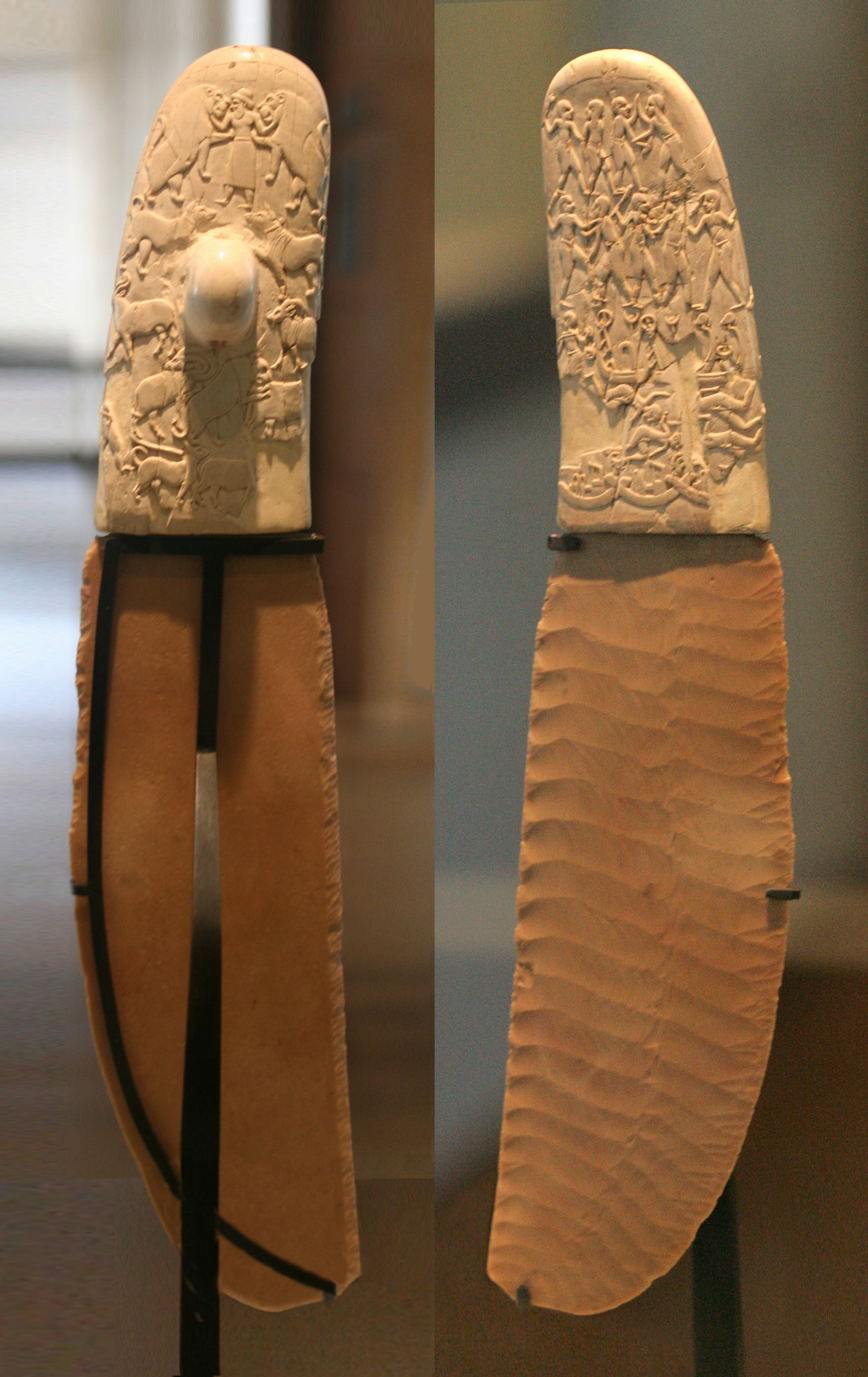
The Gebel el-Arak Knife, Louvre (3300–3200 BCE).

Multiple buildings were present at Naqada sites. The site at Tel-El Farkha, located 14 km east from El-Simbillawein in Egypt, shows evidence of breweries that date back from the Naqada II site. The breweries were surrounded by wooden fences that would have separated them from ordinary houses. The wooden fences were replaced over time by mud brick walls as evident from the excavation at Tel-El Farkha. The brewery located at Tel-El Farkha has 13 consecutive vats in the building which were probably used for the production of beer. The beer was usually made in two steps. Part of the grain was malted and the other part made into porridge. Then it would be mixed and the liquid would be removed from the mixture via sieving the liquid. This resulted in beer. Also at the Tel-El Farkha sites is evidence of buildings: one of the biggest in the site was built on top of a mound and is surrounded by thick mud brick walls and inside the building are small poorly preserved rooms that were surrounded by 30–40 cm walls. The walls around the structure were probably made for defensive reasons. There have also been jars found in this specific building suggesting that the building was also used as a warehouse.

Predynastic Egyptians in the Naqada I period traded with Nubia to the south, the oases of the western desert to the west, and the cultures of the eastern Mediterranean to the east. Trade was most likely conducted by the elites of society. People of the Naqada culture traded with cultures in Lower Nubia, most likely the A-culture group. Material evidence of the trade between the Naqada cultures and Nubians is found in the artifacts at these sites. Items that were frequently traded between the two include pottery, clothing, palettes, and stone vessels. The pottery in Nubia was mostly found in grave sites, usually around bodies. Pottery was also traded from the Levant; one piece of pottery from the Tel-El Farkha site was found to have been made out of clay that is not present in the region, suggesting that it was made and traded from the Levant. They also imported obsidian from Ethiopia to shape blades and other objects from flakes. Charcoal samples found in the tombs of Nekhen, dated to the Naqada I and II periods, have been identified as cedar from Lebanon.

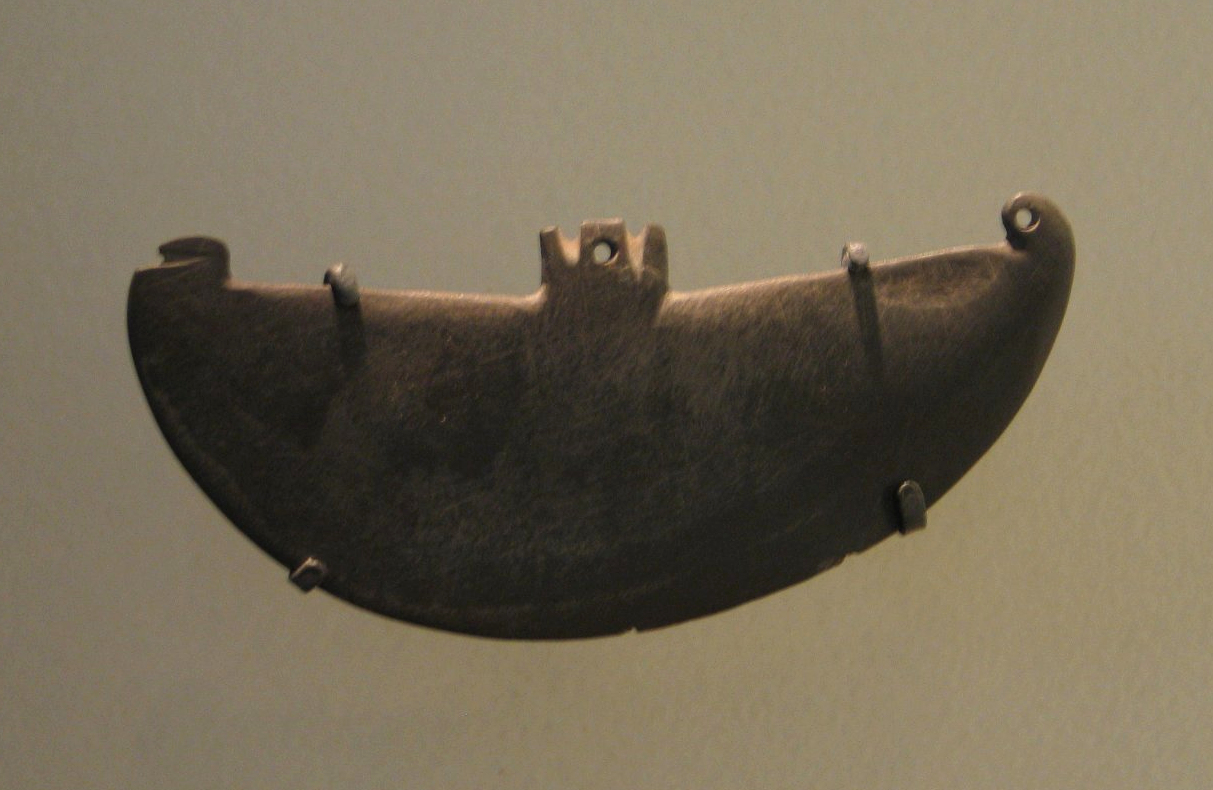
Palette in the shape of a boat, 3700–3600 BCE, Naqada I. Brooklyn Museum.

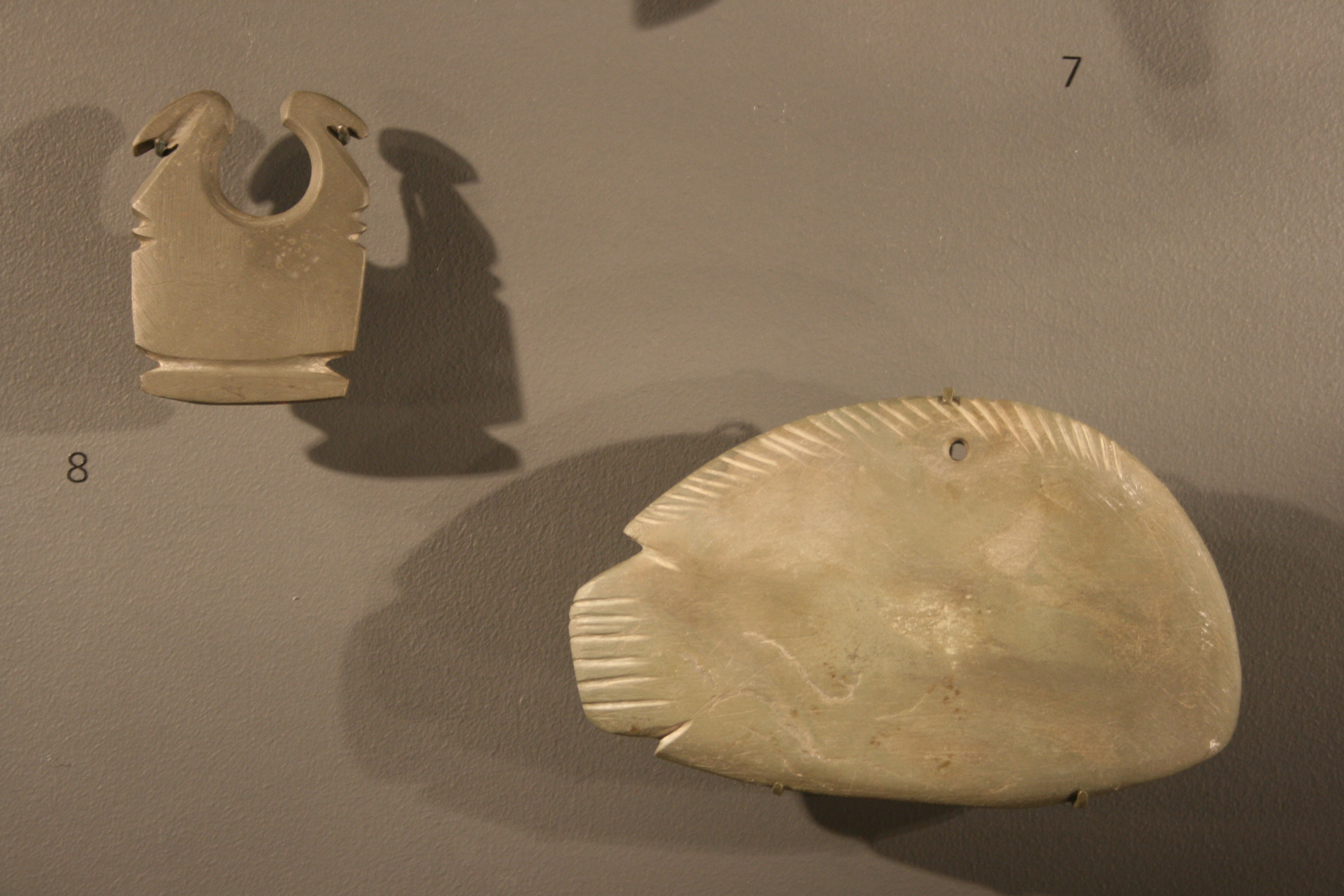
Double bird-head palette and fish palette, Naqada II

== Physical anthropological studies ==
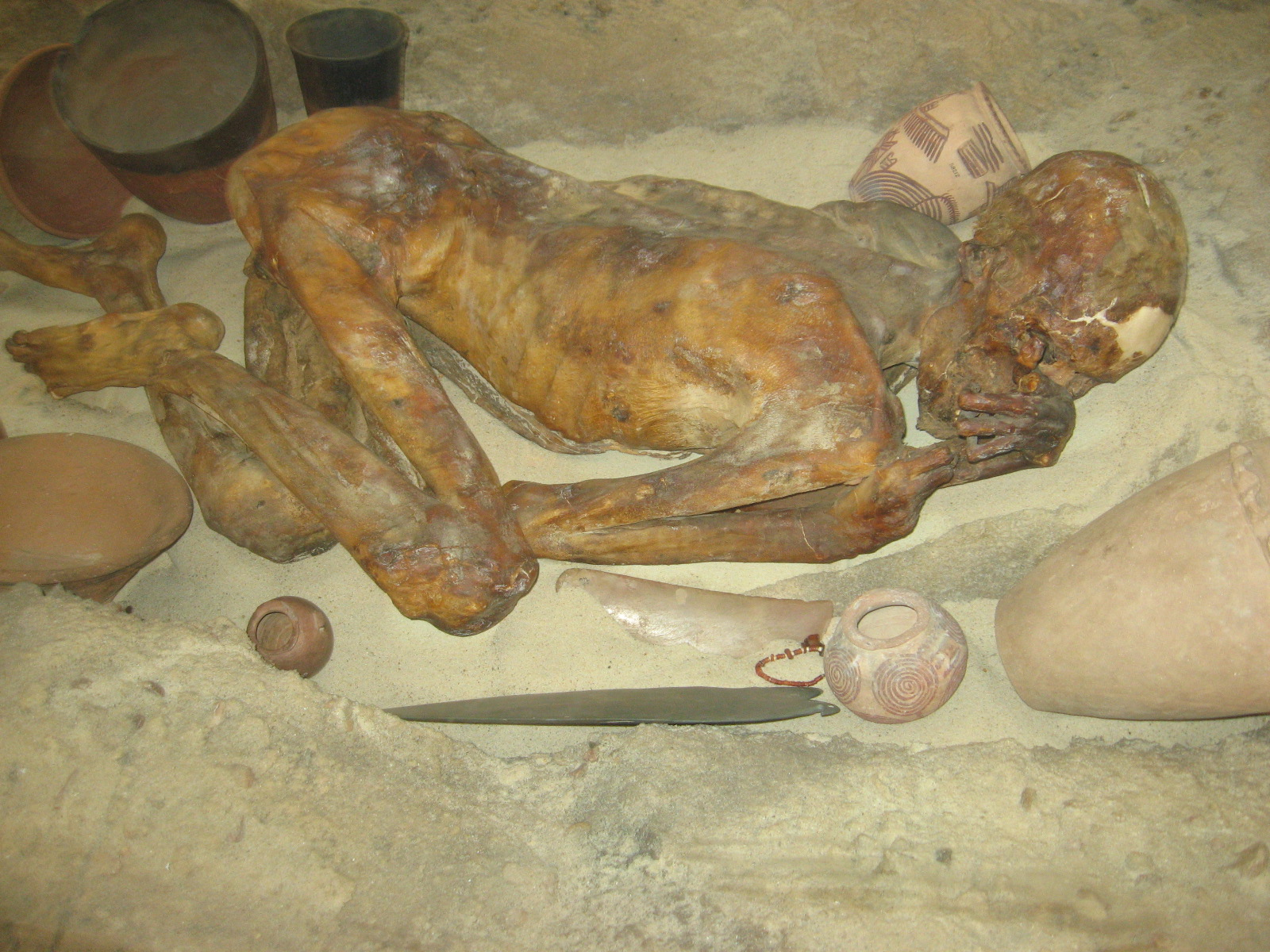
Gebelein predynastic mummy, with Naqada II decorated jars on its side, circa 3400 BC

In 1993 a craniofacial study was performed by the anthropologist C. Loring Brace, the report reached the view that "The Predynastic of Upper Egypt and the Late Dynastic of Lower Egypt are more closely related to each other than to any other population", and most similar to modern Egyptians among modern populations, stating "the Egyptians have been in place since back in the Pleistocene and have been largely unaffected by either invasions or migrations." The craniometric analysis of predynastic Naqada human remains found that they were closely related to other Afroasiatic-speaking populations inhabiting North Africa, parts of the Horn of Africa and the Maghreb, as well as to Bronze Age and medieval period Nubians and to specimens from ancient Jericho. The Naqada skeletons were also morphologically proximate to modern osteological series from Europe and the Indian subcontinent. However, the Naqada skeletons and these ancient and recent skeletons were phenotypically distinct from skeletons belonging to modern Niger-Congo-speaking populations inhabiting Sub-Saharan Africa and Tropical Africa, as well as from Mesolithic skeletons excavated at Wadi Halfa in the Nile Valley.

However, another study by Brace et al. (2006) based on 24 craniofacial measures/variables, found close affinities between Naqada Bronze, Somalis, Nubia Bronze, Nubians, and to a lesser extent, Tanzania Haya, Dahomey, and Congo. On the other hand, lower similarities were found between the Naqada sample and the other regions of the world, which included samples named Middle East, Berber, Tunisia, Algeria, Egypt, Morocco, Italy amongst others, with the exception of the Israeli Fellaheen who also plotted with Naqada Bronze.

In 2022, the methodology of the Brace study was criticised by biological anthropologist S.O.Y. Keita for "misstating the underlying assumptions of canonical variates and principal component analysis used in others' work". Also, Keita noted that the 1993 study overlooked "the fact that even in their study Egyptians could be found clustering with ancient Nubians and modern Somalis, both tropical African groups".

In 2003, Japanese anthropologists Tsunehiko Hanihara, Hajime Ishida and Yukio Dodoet examined cranial traits from 70 human populations. The survey featured sourced samples from Predynastic Naqada and 12th-13th dynasty Kushite Kerma (Sudan). In the context of the study, these samples were collectively classified as "North Africans" and other samples from Somalia along with Nigeria were classified as "Sub-Saharans", but lacked a specified dating period. Overall, the samples from predynastic Naqada and Kerma clustered most closely and more remotely with European groups, whilst the other samples from Sub-Saharan Africa showed "significant separation from other regions, as well as diversity among themselves".

On the other hand, various biological anthropological studies have found Naqada skeletal remains to have Northeastern African biological affinities. In 1996, 53 Naqada crania were measured and characterized by SOY Keita. He concluded that 61-64% were classified as southern series (which shares closest affinities with Kerma Kushites), while 36-41% were more similar to the northern Egyptian pattern (Coastal Maghrebi). In contrast, the set of Badarian crania were largely conforming to the Upper Egyptian-southern series at rates of 90-100%, with 9% possibly displaying northern affinities. This change is mainly attributed to the local migration along the Nile-Valley from northern Egyptians, and/or migration of Near-East populations, which lead to genetic exchange. The Middle Eastern series had some similarities with the early Southern Upper Egyptians and Nubians, which was considered by the researcher probably a reflection of their real presence to some degree, a consideration attested by archeological and historical sources.

The biological anthropologists, Shomarka Keita and A.J. Boyce, have stated that the "studies of crania from southern predynastic Egypt, from the formative period (4000-3100 B.C.), show them usually to be more similar to the crania of ancient Nubians, Kushites, Saharans, or modern groups from the Horn of Africa than to those of dynastic northern Egyptians or ancient or modern southern Europeans". Keita and Boyce further added that the limb proportions of early Nile Valley remains were generally closer to tropical populations. They regarded this as significant because Egypt is not located in the tropical region. The authors suggested that "the Egyptian Nile Valley was not primarily settled by cold-adapted peoples such as Europeans".

In 1996, Lovell and Prowse reported the presence of individuals buried at Naqada in what they interpreted to be elite, high-status tombs, showing them to be an endogamous ruling or elite segment who were significantly different from individuals buried in two other, apparently nonelite cemeteries, and more closely related morphologically to populations in Northern Nubia (A-Group) than to neighbouring populations at Badari and Qena in southern Egypt. Specifically, the authors stated that the Naqada samples were "more similar to the Lower Nubian protodynastic sample than they are to the geographically more proximate Egyptian samples" in Qena and Badari. Although, the samples from Naqada, Badari and Qena were all found to be significantly different from each other and from the protodynastic populations in northern Nubia. Overall, both the elite and nonelite individuals at the Naqada cemeteries were more similar to each other than they were to the samples in northern Nubia or to other predynastic samples in southern Egypt.

In 1999, Lovell summarised the findings of modern skeletal studies which had determined that "in general, the inhabitants of Upper Egypt and Nubia had the greatest biological affinity to people of the Sahara and more southerly areas" but exhibited local variation in an African context. She also wrote that the archaeological and inscriptional evidence for contact between Egypt and Syro-Palestine "suggests that gene flow from these areas was very likely".

In 2018, Godde assessed population relationships in the Nile Valley by comparing crania from 18 Egyptian and Nubian groups, spanning from Lower Egypt to Lower Nubia across 7,400 years. Overall, the results showed that the biological distance matrix demonstrates the smallest biological distances, which indicate a closer affiliation are between Kerma and Gizeh, as well as Kerma and Lisht. The greatest biological distances are assigned to Sayala C-Group and the Pan-Grave sample, along with Sayala C-Group and the Semna South Christian sample. The earliest group, the Mesolithic, demonstrated smaller biological distances with Egyptian Naqada individuals than another Nubian group (Kulubnarti Island) and inline with the Nubian Christian group from Semna South. The northern Lower Nubia and Upper Egypt samples clustered together: A-Group, C-Group, Mesolithic, Sayala C-Group, Coptic, Hesa/ Biga, Badari, and Naqada. Second, the Lower Egypt samples (Gizeh, Cairo, and Lisht) formed a relatively homogeneous grouping. Finally, Semna South (Meroitic, X-Group, Christian), the geographically close Kulubnarti (Christian), Pan-Grave, and Kerma samples also plotted close together. In sum, there was a north–south gradient in the data set.

In 2020, Godde analysed a series of crania, including two Egyptian (predynastic Badarian and Naqada series), a series of A-Group Nubians and a Bronze Age series from Lachish, Palestine. The two pre-dynastic series had strongest affinities, followed by closeness between the Naqada and the Nubian series. Further, the Nubian A-Group plotted nearer to the Egyptians and the Lachish sample placed more closely to Naqada than Badari. According to Godde the spatial-temporal model applied to the pattern of biological distances explains the more distant relationship of Badari to Lachish than Naqada to Lachish as gene flow will cause populations to become more similar over time. Overall, both Egyptian samples were more similar to the Nubian series than to the Lachish series.

In 2023, Christopher Ehret reported that physical anthropological findings, performed by Keita and Zakrzewski, had found that the "major burial sites of those founding locales of ancient Egypt in the fourth millennium BCE, notably El-Badari as well as Naqada, show no demographic indebtedness to the Levant". Ehret specified that these studies revealed cranial and dental affinities with "closest parallels" to other longtime populations in the surrounding areas of northeastern Africa "such as Nubia and the northern Horn of Africa". He further commented that "members of this population did not migrate from somewhere else but were descendants of the long-term inhabitants of these portions of Africa going back many millennia". Ehret also cited existing, archaeological, linguistic and genetic data which he argued supported the demographic history.

== Genetic data on Naqada remains ==
Several scholars have highlighted a number of methodological limitations with the application of DNA studies to Egyptian mummified remains. Moreover, Keita and Boyce (1996) noted that DNA studies had not been conducted on the southern predynastic Egyptian skeletons. According to historian William Stiebling and archaeologist Susan N. Helft, conflicting DNA analysis on Egyptian mummies has led to a lack of consensus on the genetic makeup of the ancient Egyptians and their geographic origins.

Various DNA studies have found that samples from the Kerma culture (c. 2000 BC) and Christian-era Nubia, as well as Pastoral Neolithic samples from East Africa, modern Nubians and modern Afro-Asiatic speaking populations in the Horn of Africa to be descended from a mix of West Eurasian and East African populations.

== See also ==
- Badarian culture
- Early Dynastic Egypt
- First Dynasty of Egypt
- List of Pharaohs
- Scorpion I
- Scorpion II
- Scorpion Macehead
