= Badarian culture =

Prehistoric culture in Upper Egypt

Coordinates: 27°00′N 31°25′E

- Geographical range: Egypt
- Period: Neolithic
- Dates: circa 5,000 B.C. — circa 4,000 B.C.
- Type site: El-Badari
- Characteristics: Contemporary with Tasian culture, Merimde culture
- Preceded by: Faiyum A culture
- Followed by: Amratian culture

The Badarian culture provides the earliest direct evidence of agriculture in Upper Egypt during the Predynastic Era. It flourished between 4400 and 4000 BC, and might have already emerged by 5000 BC.

== Location and excavation ==
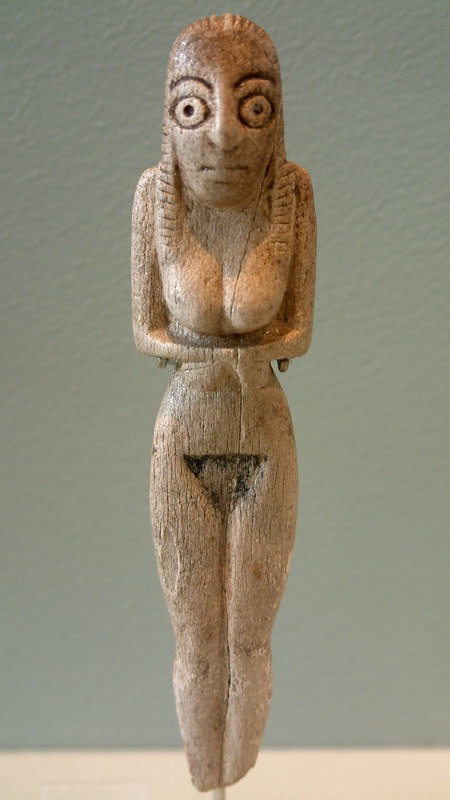
Ancient Badarian mortuary figurine of a woman, held at the Louvre

Badari culture is so named because of its discovery at El-Badari (Arabic: البداري), an area in the Asyut Governorate in Upper Egypt. It is located between Matmar and Qau, approximately 200 km (120 mi) northwest of present-day Luxor (ancient Thebes). El-Badari includes numerous Predynastic cemeteries (notably Mostagedda, Deir Tasa and the cemetery of el-Badari itself), as well as at least one early Predynastic settlement at Hemamieh. The area stretches for 30 km (19 mi) along the east bank of the Nile. Some Badarian sites also show evidence of later predynastic use.

It was first excavated by Guy Brunton and Gertrude Caton-Thompson between 1922 and 1931. About forty settlements and six hundred graves have been located.

== Cultural features ==
The Badarian economy was based mostly on agriculture, fishing and animal husbandry. Populations in the Badari culture planted wheat, barley, lentils and tubers. Pits that have been found may have served as granaries. They kept cattle, sheep, and goats; their livestock, as well as dogs, were given ceremonial burial. They used boomerangs, fished from the Nile and hunted gazelle.

Little is known of their buildings, although remains of wooden stumps have been found at one site and may have been associated with a hut or shelter of unknown construction.

The deceased were wrapped in reed matting or animal skins and buried in pits with their heads usually laid to the south, looking west. This seems contiguous with the later dynastic traditions regarding the west as the land of the dead. They were sometimes accompanied by female mortuary figures carved from ivory, or with personal items such as shells, flint tools, amulets in the shape of animals like the antelope and hippopotamus, and jewelry made of ivory, quartz or copper. Green malachite ore has also been detected on stone palettes, perhaps for personal decoration. Tools included end-scrapers, axes, bifacial sickles and concave-base arrowheads. Social stratification has been inferred from the burying of more prosperous members of the community in a different part of the cemetery. Black-topped pottery has been discovered in these cemeteries. These works with their distinctive rippled pattern are considered the most characteristic element of the Badarian culture.

British Africanist, Basil Davidson, (1995) observed that the earliest southern Egyptian farmers, Tasian and Badarian communities, were close neighbours of the Middle Nile and would have emerged from regions south-west or west of the Nile territories. In his view, the early Egyptians belonged to wide communities that lived between the Red Sea and the Atlantic Ocean, shared a common 'Saharan-Sudanese culture' and drew their reinforcements from this source whilst absorbing a number of wanderers from the Near East over time.

== Trade ==
Basalt vases found at Badari sites were most likely traded up the river from the Delta region or from the northwest. Shells came in quantities from the Red Sea. Turquoise possibly came from Sinai. A Syrian connection is suggested for a four-handled pot of hard pink ware. The black pottery, with white incised designs, may have come directly from the West, or from the South. The porphyry slabs are like the later ones in Nubia, but the material could have come from the Red Sea Mountains. The glazed steatite beads were not made locally. These all suggest that the Badarians were not an isolated tribe, but were in contact with the cultures on all sides of them. Nor were they nomadic, having pots of such size and fragility that would have been unsuitable for use by wanderers.

== Physical anthropology ==
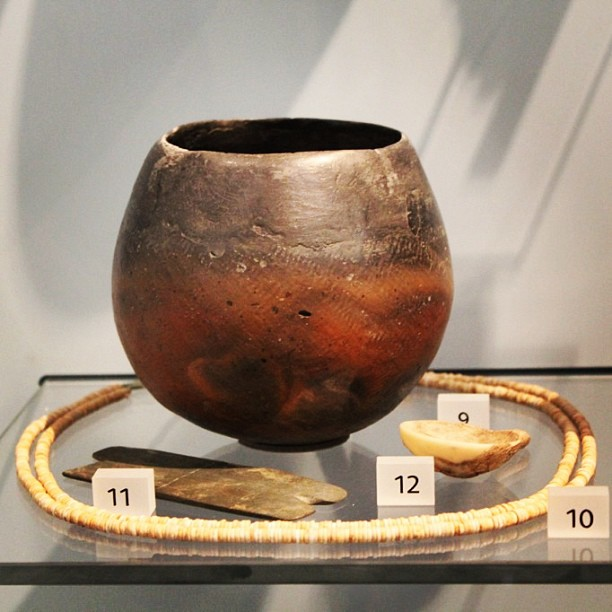
A Badarian burial. 4500–3850 BC

The Badarian culture seems to have had multiple sources, of which the Western Desert was probably the most influential. The Badari culture was likely not solely restricted to the Badari region, since related finds have been made farther to the south at Mahgar Dendera, Armant, Elkab and Nekhen (named Hierakonpolis by the Greeks), as well as to the east in the Wadi Hammamat.

Older and modern scholarship have characterised the Badarians as an indigenous, Northeast African population that was rooted in a localised, context.

An assemblage of archaeological data have identified a common African substratum for early Egyptian cultural practices. Central African tool designs are featured in the Badarian and Naqada archaeological sites. According to archaeologist, Charles Thurstan Shaw, "the early cultures of Merimde, Badari, Naqadi I and II are essentially African and early African social customs and religious beliefs were the root and foundation of Egyptian way of life."

Egyptologist Frank Yurco considered the Badarians as exhibiting a "mix of North African and Sub-Saharan physical traits", and referenced older analysis of skeletal remains which "showed tropical African elements in the population of the earliest Badarian culture".

Recent archaeological evidence has suggested that the Tasian and Badarian Nile Valley sites were a peripheral network of earlier Northeast African cultures that featured the movement of Badarian, Saharan, Nubian and Nilotic populations.

=== Cranial traits ===
In 1971, Eugene Strouhal came to the conclusion that the distribution of the Badarian skulls extends from the "Europoid" to "Negroid" range [using an obsolete system of racial classification that has since been discredited]. Of the total 117 skulls, the majority of 94 skulls showed mixed Europoid-Negroid features. The share of both components was nearly the same, with some overweight to the Europoid side. Even though the share of 'pure' Negroes is small (6-8%), being half that of the Europoid forms (12.9%), the high majority of mixed forms (80.3%) suggests a long-lasting dispersion of African genes in the population. Additionally, in some of the Badarian crania hair was preserved, in the first series they were curly in 6 cases, wavy in 33 cases and straight in 10 cases. They were black in 16 samples, dark brown in 11, brown in 12, light brown in 1, and grey in 11 cases. In 2007, Strouhal would characterize the physical features of ancient A-Group Nubians as being "Caucasoid" which were "not distinguishable from the contemporary Predynastic Upper Egyptians of the Badarian and Naqadian cultures", based in reference to previous anthropological studies from 1975 and 1985. According to Strouhal, the Predynastic Egyptians seemed to be similar to the Capsian culture of North Africa and to Berbers.

A 1993 craniofacial study performed by the anthropologist C. Loring Brace reached the view that: "The Predynastic of Upper Egypt and the Late Dynastic of Lower Egypt are more closely related to each other than to any other population. As a whole, they show ties with the European Neolithic, North Africa, modern Europe, and, more remotely, India, but not at all with sub-Saharan Africa, eastern Asia, Oceania, or the New World."

However, various biological anthropological studies have demonstrated strong biological affinities between the Badarians and other Northeast African populations. S.O.Y. Keita, a biological anthropologist, in 1990 conducted a craniometric analysis, which included early pre-dynastic Badarian and Naqada I skulls. Both series were found to "cluster with tropical Africans", and with the latter overlapping with Kerma.

In 2005, S.O.Y. Keita examined Badarian crania from predynastic upper Egypt in comparison to European (Norway and Hungary) and various tropical African crania (Southern Africa, Mali and Kenya). He found that the predynastic Badarian series clustered much closer with the tropical African series. Although, no West Asian or other North African samples were included in the original study as the comparative series were selected based on "Brace et al.'s (1993) comments on the affinities of an upper Egyptian/Nubian epipalaeolithic series". Keita further noted that "additional analysis using material from Sudan, late dynastic northern Egypt (Gizeh), Somalia, Asia and the Pacific Islands show the Badarian series to be most similar to a series from the northeast quadrant of Africa and then to other Africans". Moreover, Keita criticised the methodology of the 1993 Brace study for excluding "the Maghreb, Sudan, and the Horn of Africa" from the designated Sub-Saharan group samples which he argued was nearly categorised and "(incorrectly)" as monolithic". Keita further commented on the findings of Boyce that whilst the "post-Badarian southern predynastic and a late dynastic northern series (called "E" or Gizeh) cluster together, and secondarily with Europeans", in the primary cluster with Egyptian groups there were also remains representing populations from ancient Sudan and recent Somalia.

In 2008, Keita found that the early predynastic groups in Southern Egypt which included Badarian skeletal samples, were similar to Nile-Valley material from areas to the south and north of Upper Egypt. Overall, based on the 9 variables, the dynastic Egyptians (includes both Upper and Lower Egyptians) showed much closer affinities with the included Northeast African populations than Europeans, who were more similar to the set of Late Dynastic Egyptians. In his comparison to the various Egyptian series, Greeks, Somali/Horn, and Italians were used. He also concluded that more material was needed to make a firm conclusion about the relationship between the early Holocene Nile valley populations and later ancient Egyptians.

Kanya Godde in a 2009 study evaluated population relationships by comparing cranial traits in twelve Nubian and Egyptian groups which included skeletal remains from the Badarian period. The results showed small biological distance between the groups, which indicate there may have been some sort of gene flow between these groups of Nubians and Egyptians or a common adaptation to similar environments. Godde further specified that the Badarians, Naqadans and Kerma Nubian samples clustered closely in spite of the timescale differences. She also cited previous anthropological studies and archaeological evidence which indicated close affinities between the Badarians and other southernly, African populations. In 2020, Godde analysed a series of crania which included two Egyptian (predynastic Badarian and Naqada series), a series of A-Group Nubians, and a Bronze Age series from Lachish, Palestine. The two pre-dynastic series had strongest affinities, followed by closeness between the Naqada and the Nubian series. Further, the Nubian A-Group plotted nearer to the Egyptians and the Lachish sample placed more closely to Naqada than Badari. According to Godde the spatial-temporal model applied to the pattern of biological distances explains the more distant relationship of Badari to Lachish than Naqada to Lachish as gene flow will cause populations to become more similar over time. Overall, both Egyptian samples were more similar to the Nubian series than to the Lachish series.

In 2023, Christopher Ehret wrote that the physical anthropological findings, performed by Keita and Zakrzewski, from the "major burial sites of those founding locales of ancient Egypt in the fourth millennium BCE, notably El-Badari as well as Naqada, show no demographic indebtedness to the Levant". Ehret specified that these studies revealed cranial and dental affinities with "closest parallels" to other longtime populations in the surrounding areas of Northeastern Africa "such as Nubia and the northern Horn of Africa". He further commented that "members of this population did not come from somewhere else but were descendants of the long-term inhabitants of these portions of Africa going back many millennia". Ehret also cited existing, archaeological, linguistic and genetic data which he argued supported the demographic history.

Some researchers have critiqued the reliability of craniology—the study of skull shapes and sizes—in drawing definitive conclusions about the biological relationships and identities of ancient populations. Critics argue that cranial morphology can be influenced by various factors which may not accurately reflect genetic ancestry or population dynamics. According to S.O.Y. Keita, relying solely on cranial measurements without considering broader archaeological and environmental contexts can lead to oversimplified or misleading interpretations. Keita emphasizes that "cranial metrics alone are insufficient for determining discrete biological populations, especially in regions with significant genetic diversity and historical population movements".

Furthermore, advancements in genetic and genomic studies have provided more robust tools for investigating ancient human populations. Researchers such as Ron Pinhasi and Jay T. Stock strongly advocate for integrating craniometric data with genetic, archaeological, and environmental evidences to offer a more comprehensive understanding of population history and biological relationships. They argue that conclusions drawn strictly from craniological or other morphological analyses about cultural or ancestral relationships should be approached with caution and supported by multiple lines of evidence. Genetic studies can reveal ancestry and migration patterns that are not discernible through morphology alone. Advancements in ancient DNA analysis and other bioarchaeological methodologies have provided more precise tools for investigating genetic relationships and migration patterns.

=== Dental traits ===
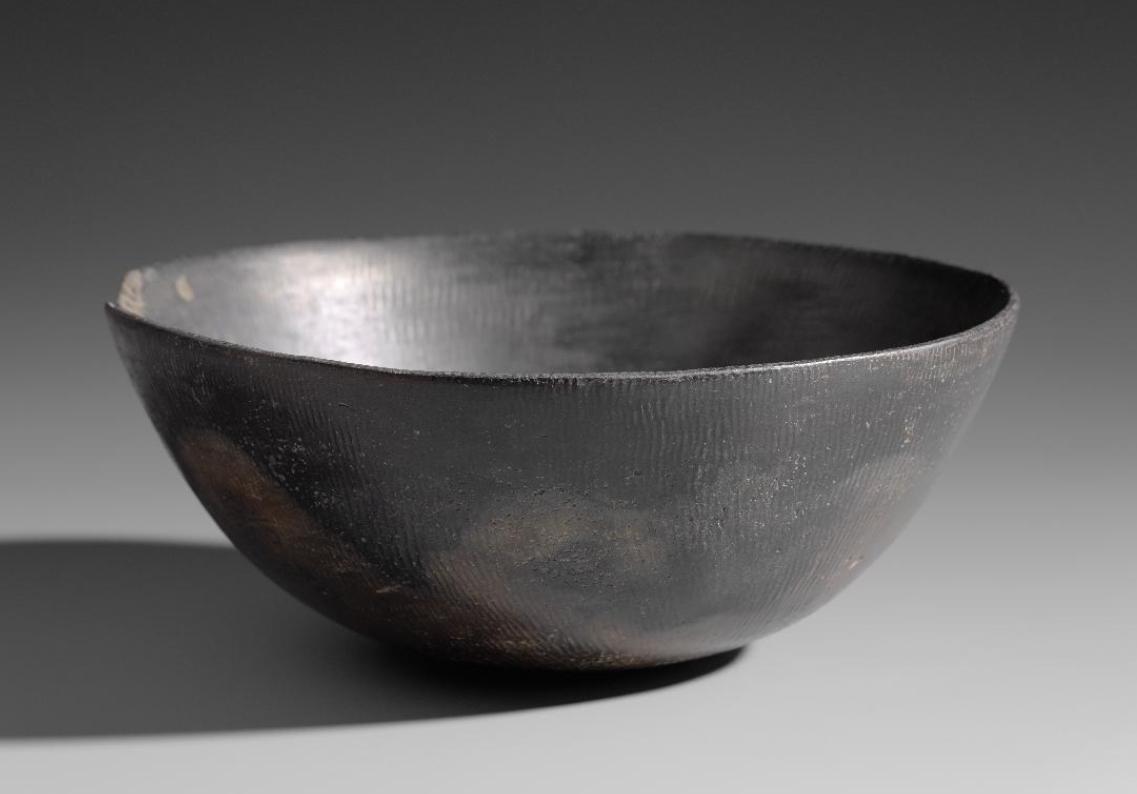
Polished bowl with rippled surface. Matmar, grave 2110. Badarian culture

Joel D. Irish and Lyle Konigsberg (2007) re-examined the findings of a 1955 study in light of recent archaeological and dental morphological data. They stated that re-inspection of the craniometric samples "indicate a Badarian affiliation to North Africans, not sub-Saharan samples".

Dental trait analysis of Badarian fossils conducted in a thesis study found that they were closely related to other Afroasiatic-speaking populations inhabiting Northeast Africa and the Maghreb. Among the ancient populations, the Badarians were nearest to other ancient Egyptians (Naqada, Hierakonpolis, Abydos and Kharga in Upper Egypt; Hawara in Lower Egypt), and C-Group and Pharaonic era skeletons excavated in Lower Nubia, followed by the A-Group culture bearers of Lower Nubia, the Kerma and Kush populations in Upper Nubia, the Meroitic, X-Group and Christian period inhabitants of Lower Nubia, and the Kellis population in the Dakhla Oasis. Among the recent groups, the Badari markers were morphologically closest to the Shawia and Kabyle Berber populations of Algeria as well as Bedouin groups in Morocco, Libya and Tunisia, followed by other Afroasiatic-speaking populations in the Horn of Africa. The Late Roman era Badarian skeletons from Kellis were also phenotypically distinct from those belonging to other populations in Sub-Saharan Africa.

A 2025 report used 3D morphometrics on the teeth and bony labyrinth structures from skeletal material of 171 individuals from 15 Nile Valley sites. As well as a comparative dataset of 121 individuals from northeastern Africa, the wider continent, and Eurasia making 12 assemblages as a comparison. These anatomical characteristics were chosen because they are highly heritable and strong markers of biological affinity. There was homogeneity with the late Pleistocene and early Holocene hunter-gatherer and fishing populations, with a continuity amongst these foragers. During the Neolithic transitions to agriculture there is morphological discontinuity, with new groups entering the Nile Valley, who had likely Near-Eastern affinities. Despite this influx, there was no total population replacement, with older forager groups persisting in peripheral zones. The El-Badari population was considered as heterogenous and represented admixture, showing high internal biological diversity. Being shaped by indigenous groups and external migration, some individuals from the Badari culture resembled more the earlier Nile foragers, and others Neolithic migrants.

While dental trait analysis has been a useful tool in bioarchaeology for assessing biological relationships among ancient populations, recent scholarship highlights its limitations. Researchers caution that relying exclusively on dental morphology can be problematic due to factors such as environmental influences, dietary practices, and genetic drift, which can affect dental characteristics independently of genetic ancestry. Dental traits may exhibit convergent evolution, where similar dental features develop in unrelated populations due to similar selective pressures, potentially leading to misinterpretations of population affinities.

Bioanthropologist Christy G. Turner II and colleagues have emphasized that "dental morphology alone may not provide a complete picture of population relationships and must be integrated with other lines of evidence." They advocate for a multidisciplinary approach to achieve a more comprehensive understanding of an ancient population.

=== Limb proportions ===
Sonia Zakrzewski (2003), found that samples from the Badarian to the Middle Kingdom in Upper Egypt had "tropical body plans", but that their proportions were actually "super-negroid" (i.e. the limb indices are relatively longer than in many "African" populations). She proposed that the apparent development of an increasingly African body plan over time may also be due to Nubian mercenaries being included in the Middle Kingdom sample. Although, she noted that in spite of the differences in tibae lengths among the Badarian and Early Dynastic samples, that "all samples lie relatively clustered together as compared to the other populations." Zakrzewski concluded that the "results must remain provisional due to the relatively small sample sizes and the lack of skeletal material that cross-cuts all social and economic groups within each time period".

In 2011, Michelle Raxter examined the changes in limb proportions and body sizes in ancient Egyptians in a worldwide and regional comparative thesis study. The study featured 92 males and 528 female samples which included skeletal remains from the Badarian period. The Egyptian body sizes were compared with Nubian samples, as well as to modern Egyptian samples and other higher and lower latitude populations. Overall, the study found that "Ancient Egyptians have more tropically adapted limbs in comparison to body breadths, which tend to be intermediate when plotted against higher and lower latitude populations. These results may reflect the greater plasticity of limb lengths compared to body breadth. The results might also suggest early Mediterranean and/or Near Eastern influence in Northeast Africa". Raxter also acknowledged that a larger sample collection from the early and late predynastic groups would have enabled "closer examination of biological changes in the transition to agriculture".

Limb proportion analysis has been utilized in physical anthropology to study climatic adaptations and infer aspects of population history among ancient groups. Measurements such as the brachial index (upper arm to forearm ratio) and crural index (thigh to lower leg ratio) have been used to assess thermoregulatory adaptations according to Allen's rule, which posits that populations in warmer climates tend to have longer limbs to dissipate heat, while those in colder climates have shorter limbs to conserve heat.

Scholarship has also highlighted the limitations of drawing definitive conclusions about cultural identity or ancestry based solely on limb proportions. Factors such as environmental influences during growth, nutritional status, and genetic admixture can affect limb development independently of genetic heritage or cultural practices. Additionally, plasticity in human growth can result in limb proportion variations within a population over relatively short time spans, potentially leading to misinterpretations when inferring long-term population histories. Anthropologist Tenton W. Holliday further cautions that "while limb proportions can provide insights into broad patterns of climatic adaptation, they are not definitive indicators of genetic relationships or cultural affiliations among ancient populations." Holliday emphasizes the importance of integrating multiple lines of data for a more accurate biological history.

== Genetic data on the Badarian remains ==
Keita and Boyce (1996) noted that DNA studies had not been conducted on the southern predynastic Egyptian skeletons. Several scholars have highlighted a number of methodological limitations with the application of DNA studies to Egyptian mummified remains. According to historian William Stiebling and archaeologist Susan N. Helft, conflicting DNA analysis on Egyptian mummies has led to a lack of consensus on the genetic makeup of the ancient Egyptians and their geographic origins.

Although no remains of pre-dynastic material has been sequenced, various DNA studies have found Christian-era and modern Nubians, along with modern Afro-Asiatic speaking populations in the Horn of Africa to be descended from a mix of West Eurasian and African populations.

== Gallery ==
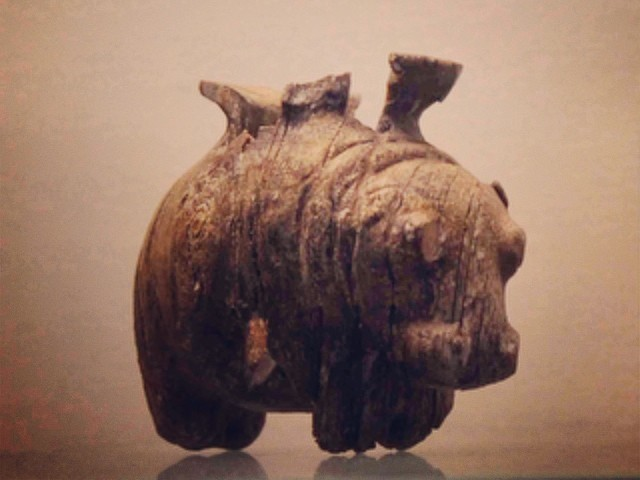
Vase in the shape of a hippopotamus. Early Predynastic, Badarian. 5th millennium BC. From Mostagedda. This vessel is carved from elephant ivory. The fine modeling and attention to detail show the skill in achieving these pieces.

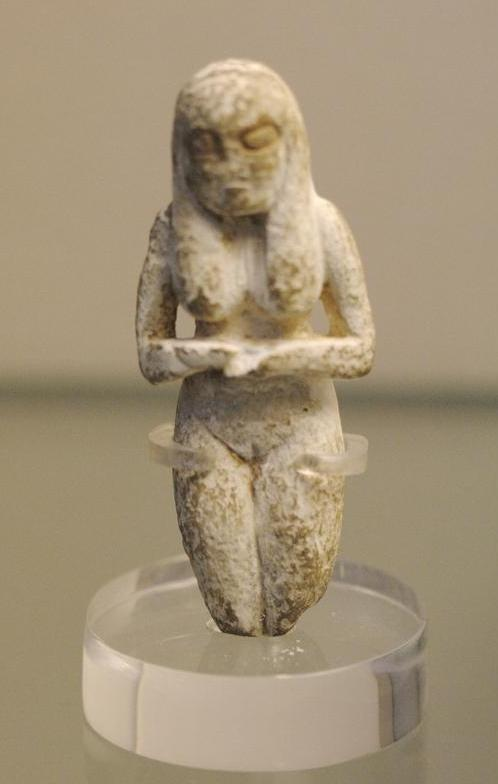
Ancient Badarian mortuary figurine of a woman, held at the British Museum

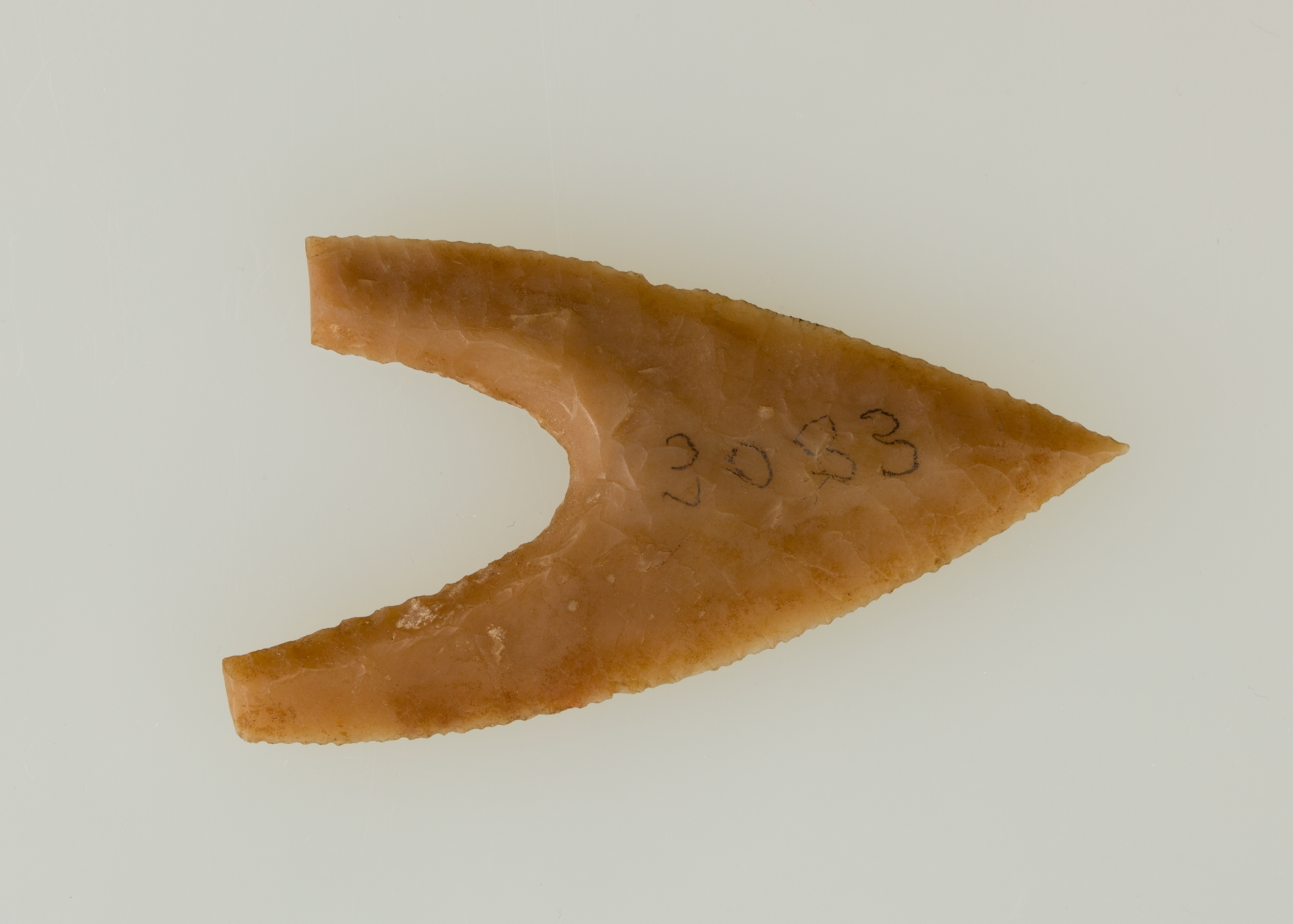
Badarian arrowhead, 4000-3800 BC.

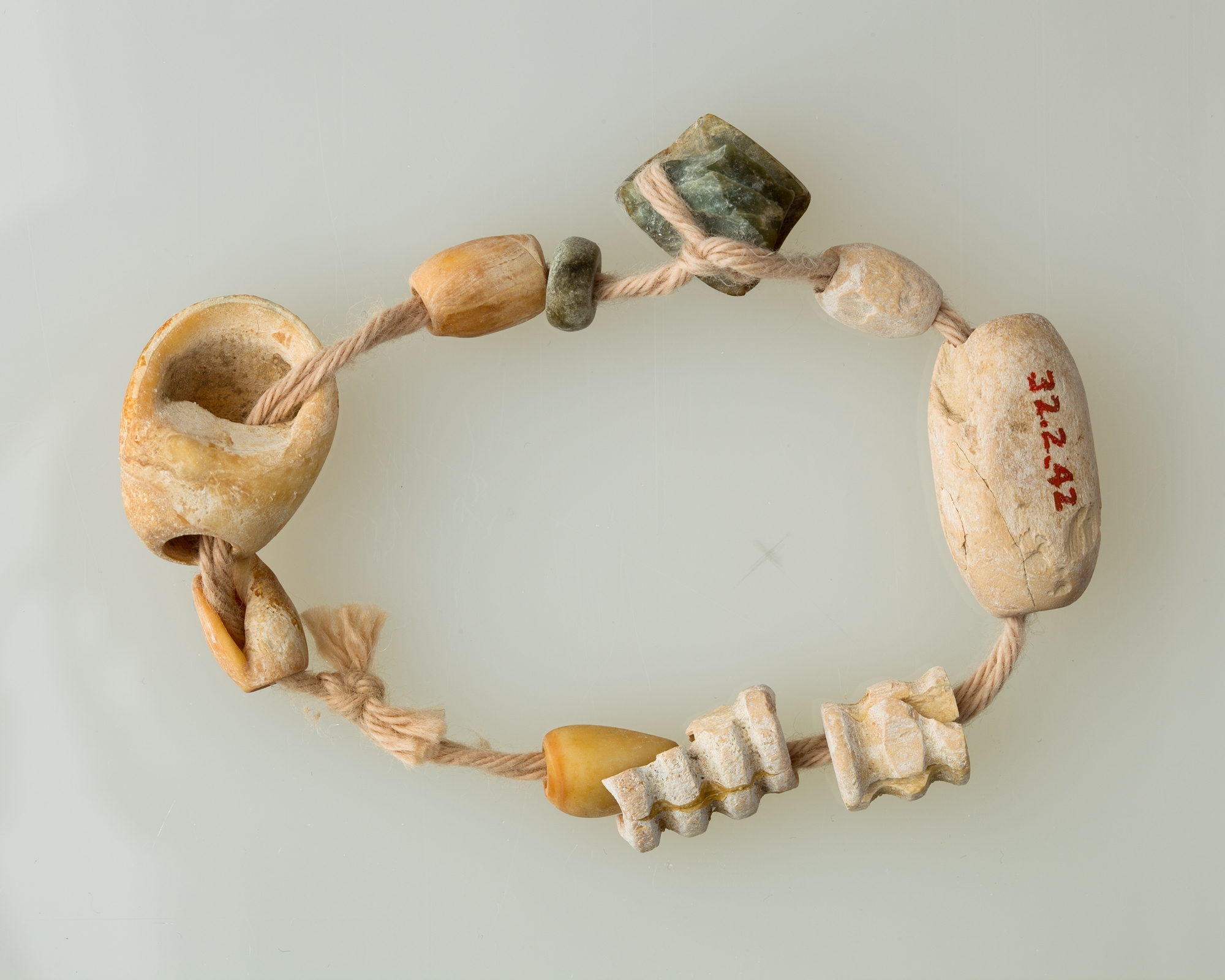
String of bead, Badarian, 4400-3800 BC.

== See also ==
- Early Dynastic Egypt
- First Dynasty of Egypt
- List of Pharaohs
- Merimde culture
- Scorpion I
- Scorpion II
- Scorpion Macehead
- Tasian culture
