= Elise Jenny Baumgartel =

German Egyptologist and prehistorian (1892–1975)

- Born: Elise Jenny Goldschmidt; 5 October 1892; Berlin, German Empire
- Died: 28 October 1975 (aged 83); Oxford, United Kingdom
- Education: University of Berlin; University of Königsberg
- Spouse: Hubert Baumgartel
- Children: 3
- Scientific career
- Fields: Egyptology; Prehistoric archaeology
- Thesis: Tunis (Algier und Nachbargebeite) Neolithikum (1927)
- Doctoral advisor: Walter Wreszinski

Elise Jenny Baumgartel (née Goldschmidt, 5 October 1892 – 28 October 1975) was a German Egyptologist and prehistorian who pioneered the study of the archaeology of predynastic Egypt.

== Early career ==
Elise Jenny Goldschmidt was born in Berlin on 5 October 1892, her father was Rudolf Goldschmidt. She enrolled at the University of Berlin with the intention to study medicine, but became interested in Egyptology, which she studied under Adolf Erman and Kurt Heinrich Sethe. Dissatisfied with the traditional text-dominated approach to Egyptology of the time, Baumgartel decided to focus on archaeology in her doctoral studies at the University of Königsberg. She contended that the key to understanding Egypt's neglected prehistoric period was to put it in its wider regional context. To that end, her thesis analysed funerary traditions in Neolithic North Africa, arguing that North African dolmen graves were the forerunners of early Egyptian mastabas, and ultimately the pyramids. This challenged the prevailing hyper-diffusionist views of Grafton Elliot Smith, who argued that almost all elements of human culture originated in Egypt and spread outwards.

Baumgartel had spent much of her time in Berlin cataloguing the extensive collections of lithic artefacts in the city's museums. After receiving her doctorate in 1927, she therefore obtained a scholarship to study under the noted French lithicist Henri Breuil in Paris. For the next six years she was sponsored by the Notgemeinschaft der Deutschen Wissenschaft to work on the lithic chronology of the southern Mediterranean. During this time she participated in excavations, including at Wadi Sheik in Egypt and Monte Gargano in Italy, and visited ancient and modern flint mines across Europe.

== Work on the Petrie collection ==
When the Nazi Party seized power in Germany in 1933, Baumgartel (who was Jewish) lost her state funding. She was forced to flee to England the following year. For a number of years her family (three children from an earlier marriage to art historian Hubert Baumgartel) was dependent on refugee charities. The archaeological and Egyptological communities in England rallied to obtain monetary support for her work: Sir John L. Myres arranged a grant for her to compile a bibliography of prehistoric Italy and Malta, and she also taught evening classes on the Egyptian language for University College London (UCL). This however did not occupy much of her time, so in 1936 she approached Stephen Glanville, the head of UCL's Egyptology department, for permission to work with the department's collections (what would become the Petrie Museum). The department had recently obtained the substantial personal collection of Glanville's predecessor, Sir Flinders Petrie, which was uncatalogued and poorly labelled. Glanville therefore enthusiastically accepted Baumgartel's offer, and arranged for her work to be supported by the Petrie collection's patron Sir Robert Mond, and later by the department itself.

After organising and indexing the Petrie collection, Baumgartel intended to publish a full catalogue of the material. However, this work was interrupted by the outbreak of the Second World War in 1939, when the collections had to be moved to storage. Baumgartel herself relocated to Somerville College, Oxford, where she was hosted by Dame Lucy Sutherland and joined a large community of refugee scholars. She modified her plans and, supported by a grant from the Griffith Institute, began working on a comprehensive overview of predynastic Egypt, published in 1947 as The Cultures of Prehistoric Egypt (I). When the Petrie collection became available again after the war, she added a second volume and revised the first. In this landmark monograph, Baumgartel maintained her conviction that the prehistory of Egypt must be understood in the context of the regional archaeology, not through the "backwards-projection" of later texts. In particular, she challenged her teacher Kurt Sethe's thesis that Egyptian civilization originated in the Nile Delta, instead stressing, based on archaeological evidence, the primacy of Upper Egypt.

Upon the completion of her two volume study, Baumgartel relocated to the United States, helping her family to set up a confectionary factory. Together with compensation from the German government for property lost during the war, this made her financially secure for the rest of her life.

== Later career and the Naqada chronology ==
In the course of her study Baumgartel became convinced that Petrie's sequence dating of predynastic Egypt (the only means of dating prehistoric archaeological remains before the advent of radiocarbon dating) contained significant errors. The chronology was based largely on the Naqada tombs, but Petrie had only published information on 136 of the 2200 graves he excavated. Petrie's assistant Margaret Murray told Baumgartel that his original notebooks, containing the documentation on the rest of the tombs, had been destroyed. Nevertheless, Baumgartel set out to revise the chronology by re-examining objects from the Naqada tombs in museums around the world – a task that would take thirty years. When a number of Petrie's notebooks were found in a box under a telephone at UCL, Baumgartel prepared them for publication along with her now extensive catalogue of Naqada artefacts in collections. Unfortunately, it was not until after her death that the remainder of the notebooks were rediscovered; they were not destroyed after all.

Baumgartel worked as Head of the Egyptology Department at Manchester Museum from 1948-1950.

In 1964 Baumgartel returned to Oxford to work on cataloguing its lithic collection. Whilst there she worked on a chapter on predynastic Egypt for the Cambridge Ancient History as well as a third edition of her Cultures of Prehistoric Egypt. However, by now her work was being heavily criticised for its reliance on now outdated diffusionist ideas, as well as her staunch insistence that Lower Egypt was a "cultural backwater" in the predynastic period, despite mounting evidence to the contrary in the form of new discoveries and the new technique of radiocarbon dating. The third edition was therefore never published.

Baumgartel died in Oxford on 28 October 1975.

== Works ==
- The Cultures of Prehistoric Egypt, Vol.1 London, Oxford University Press, 1947; 2. Vol. 2 London, Oxford University Press, 1960.
