= El Badari, Egypt =

Town in the Asyut Governorate, Upper Egypt

El Badari البداري
- Location within Egypt
- Coordinates: 26°59′33″N 31°24′54″E
- Country: Egypt
- Governorate: Asyut
- Named for: Anba Darius

Area
  - Total: 24.6 km^{2} (9.5 sq mi)
- Elevation: 51 m (167 ft)

Population (2023)
  - Total: 59,570
  - Density: 2,420/km^{2} (6,270/sq mi)
- Time zone: UTC+2 (EGY)
  - Summer (DST): UTC+3 (EEST)

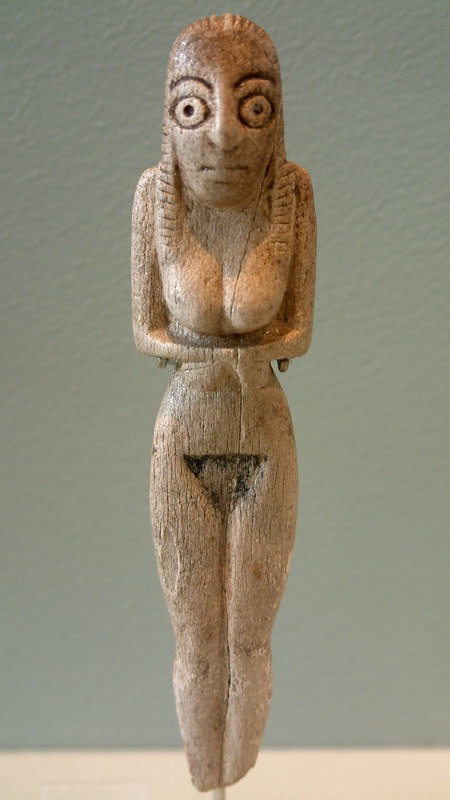
Ancient Badarian mortuary figurine.

El Badari (Arabic: البداري) is a town in the Asyut Governorate, Upper Egypt, located between Matmar and Qaw El Kebir.

== Etymology ==
The older name of the town is Berdanis (Arabic: بردنيس) or Badarnos (Arabic: بادارنوس), which Timm derives from Anba Darius.

== Archaeology ==
El Badari contains an archaeological site with numerous Predynastic cemeteries (notably Mostagedda, Deir Tasa and the cemetery of El Badari itself), as well as at least one early Predynastic settlement at Hammamia. The area stretches for 30 km (19 mi) along the east bank of the Nile, and was first excavated by Guy Brunton and Gertrude Caton-Thompson between 1922 and 1931.

The finds from El Badari form the original basis for the Badarian culture (c. 5500-4000 BC), the earliest phase of the Upper Egyptian Predynastic period.
