= Sonia Zakrzewski =

British archaeologist of Egypt

Sonia Zakrzewski FSA

Academic work
- Discipline: Archaeology
- Sub-discipline: Bioarchaeology
- Institutions: University of Durham; University of Southampton

Sonia Ruth Zakrzewski FSA is a bioarchaeologist and associate professor at the University of Southampton.

== Career ==
She is a member of the Paleopathology Association, and on the organising board of the Society for the Study of Human Biology (SSHB) and the British Association for Biological Anthropology & Osteoarchaeology (BABAO). She was elected as a fellow of the Society of Antiquaries of London on 11 November 2011.

== Select publications ==
- Wright, S. S. E., Dickinson, A., & Zakrzewski, S. (2020). Getting to grips with 3D printed bones: using 3D models as 'diagrams' to improve accessibility of palaeopathological data. Papers from the Institute of Archaeology 29(1). doi:10.14324/111.2041-9015.012.
- Woods, C., Fernee, C., Browne, M., Zakrzewski, S., & Dickinson, A. (2017). The potential of statistical shape modelling for geometric morphometric analysis of human teeth in archaeological research. PLoS ONE, 12(12), [e0186754]. doi:10.1371/journal.pone.0186754.
- Carton, J., Pollard, J., & Zakrzewski, S. (2016). An early Neolithic mortuary deposit from the Woodford G2 long barrow. Wiltshire Archaeological and Natural History Magazine, 109, 79–90.
- Inskip, S. A., Taylor, G. M., Zakrzewski, S. R., Mays, S., Pike, A. W. G., Llewellyn, G., ... Stewart, G. R. (2015). Osteological, biomolecular and geochemical examination of an Early Anglo-Saxon case of lepromatous leprosy. PLoS ONE, 10(5), 1–128. [e0124282]. doi:10.1371/journal.pone.0124282.
- Cashmore, L., & Zakrzewski, S. R. (2013). Assessment of musculoskeletal stress marker development in the hand. International Journal of Osteoarchaeology, 23(3), 334–347. doi:10.1002/oa.1254.
