= Merimde culture =

Archaeological culture

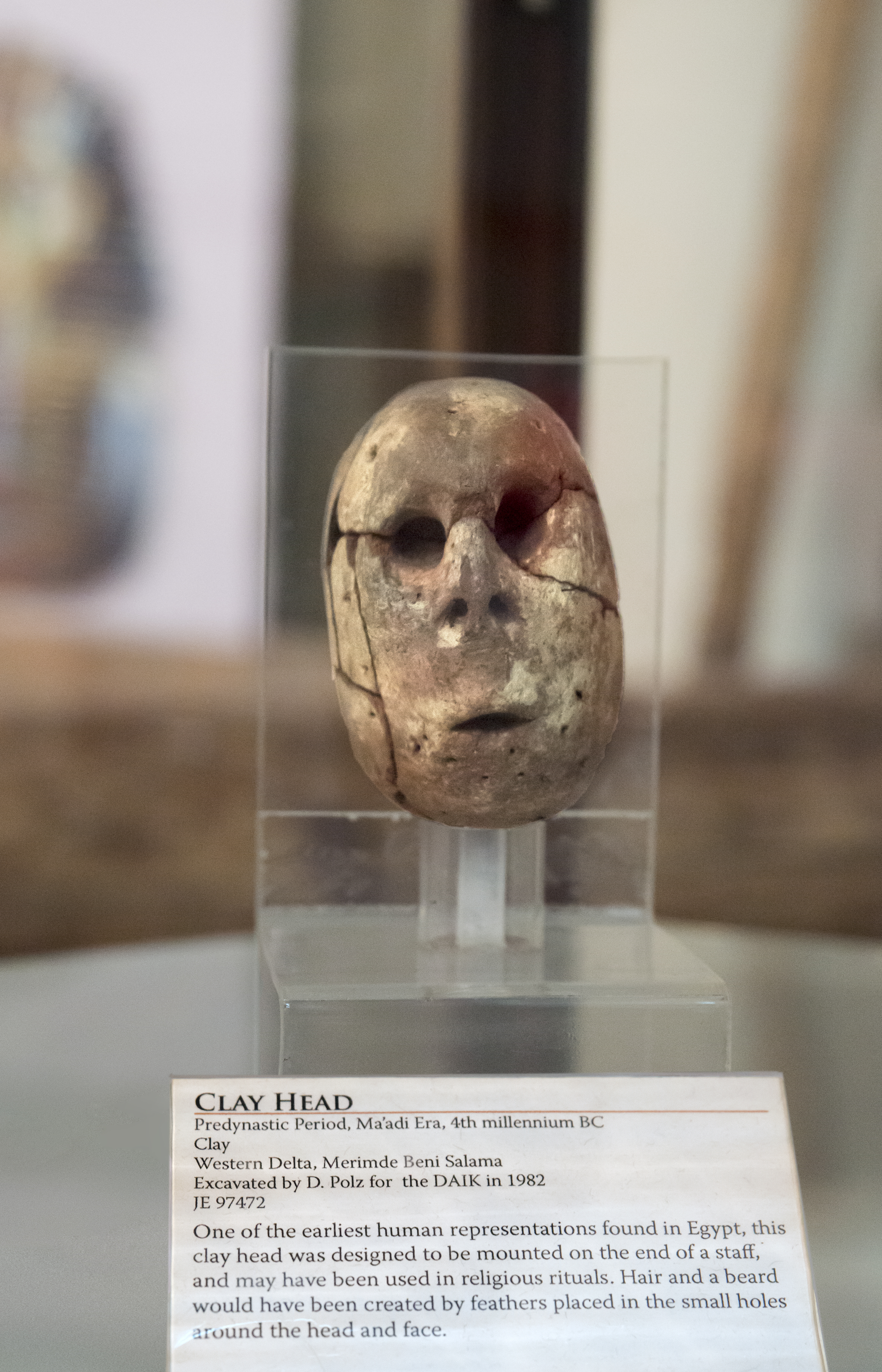
- Merimde clay head, Predynastic Period, Maadi Era, 4th millennium BCE. This is one of the earliest known representations of a human head in Egypt.
- Geographical range: Egypt
- Period: Neolithic
- Dates: c. 4,800 BC — 4,300 BC
- Characteristics: Contemporary with Tasian culture, Badari culture
- Preceded by: Faiyum A culture
- Followed by: Amratian culture

The Merimde culture (also Merimde Beni-Salame or Benisalam) (Arabic: مرمدة بني سلامة) was a Neolithic culture in the West Nile Delta in Lower Egypt, which corresponds in its later phase to the Faiyum A culture and the Badari culture in Predynastic Egypt. It is estimated that the culture evolved between 4800 and 4300 BC. Merimde also refers to the archaeological site of the same name.

== Archaeological work ==
The culture was concentrated around Merimde Beni Salama, the main settlement site, located in the West delta of the Nile in Lower Egypt 45 km northwest of Cairo. The site was discovered by German archaeologist Hermann Junker, who excavated 6,400 m^{2} of the site during his West Nile Delta expedition in 1928.

Early on, the settlement had been considered to be ca. 25 hectares, but recent research expanded this to at least 40 hectares.

Later excavations in the 1970s performed by the Egyptian Antiquities Organization and the German Institute of Archaeology led to the establishment of the stratigraphical sequence.

== Characteristics ==
Merimde shows a sequence of occupations which lasted almost a millennium according to some estimates. While Junker identified three sequences, others such as Joseph Eiwanger established in 1977 that there are five with significantly different levels of development. Artifacts such as ceramics were quite primitive during phase I – a phase characterized by a light occupation. Eiwanger documented that storage areas appeared during phase II when the intensity of the occupation increased.

=== Economy ===
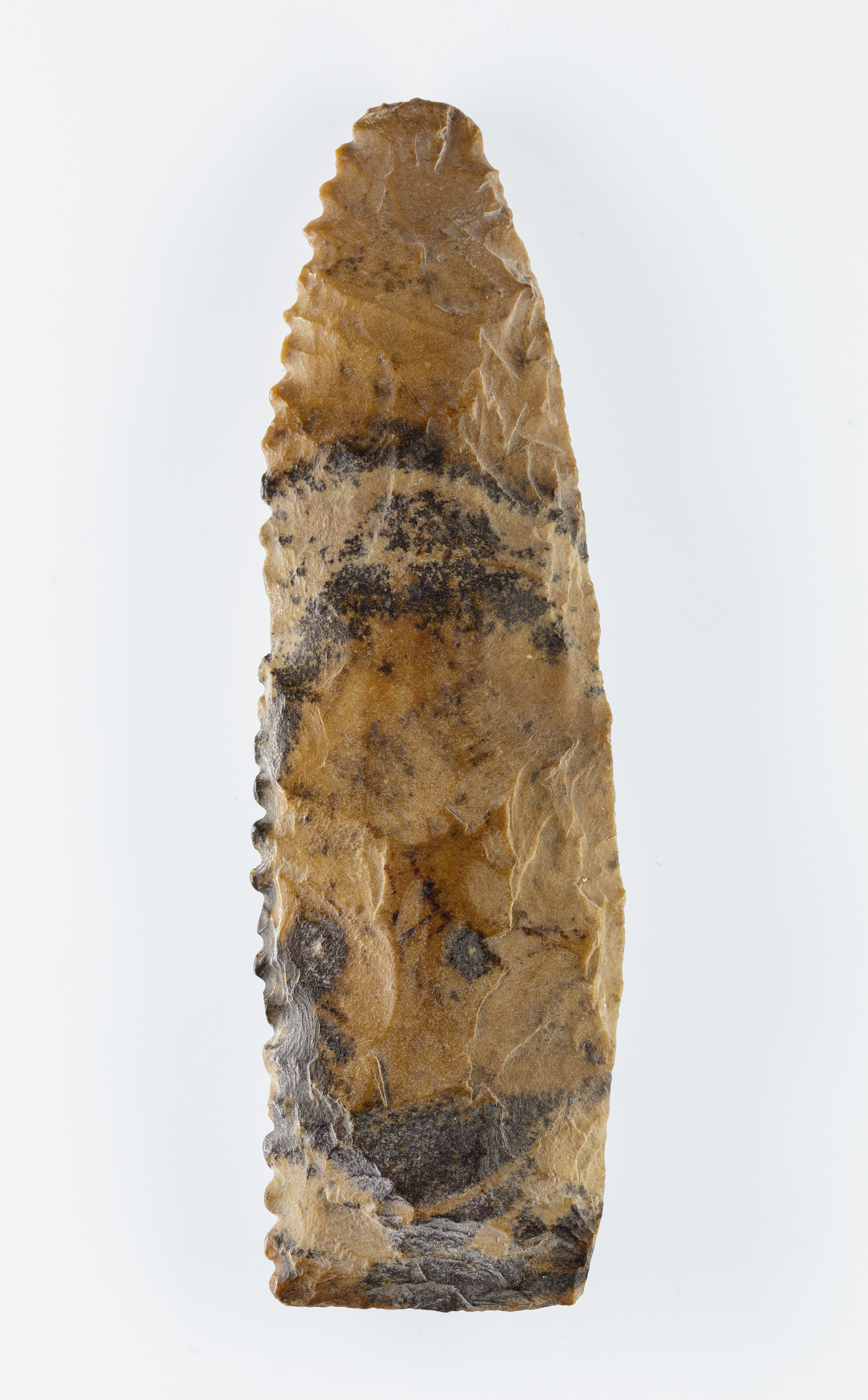
Bifacial sickle insert, 4500-4000 BCE, Merimda Beni Salama. The sharp edges were used for the cutting of grain stalks.

Archaeological evidence suggests that the Merimde economy was dominated by agriculture although some fishing and hunting were practiced to a lesser degree. The settlement consisted of small huts made of wattle and reed with a round or elliptical ground plan. Merimde pottery lacked "rippled marks".

=== Burials ===
Burials had unique characteristics, different from those practiced in Upper Egyptian Predynastic Egypt and later Dynastic Egypt. There were no separate areas for cemeteries and the dead were buried within the settlement in a flexed position in oval pits without grave goods and offerings.

In the time of the Maadi-Buto culture, the place was used as a cemetery.

Excavations of Merimde burials have yielded a number of skeletons, chiefly those of females. The fossils are generally taller and more robust than later predynastic Egyptian specimens. In this regard, the Merimde skeletons are most similar to those associated with the Tasian culture. Furthermore, although the Merimde crania are dolichocephalic (long-headed) like many of the other predynastic skulls, they have a large and wide vault like the Tasian crania. Skulls excavated from Badarian, Amratian sites tend instead to be smaller and narrow.

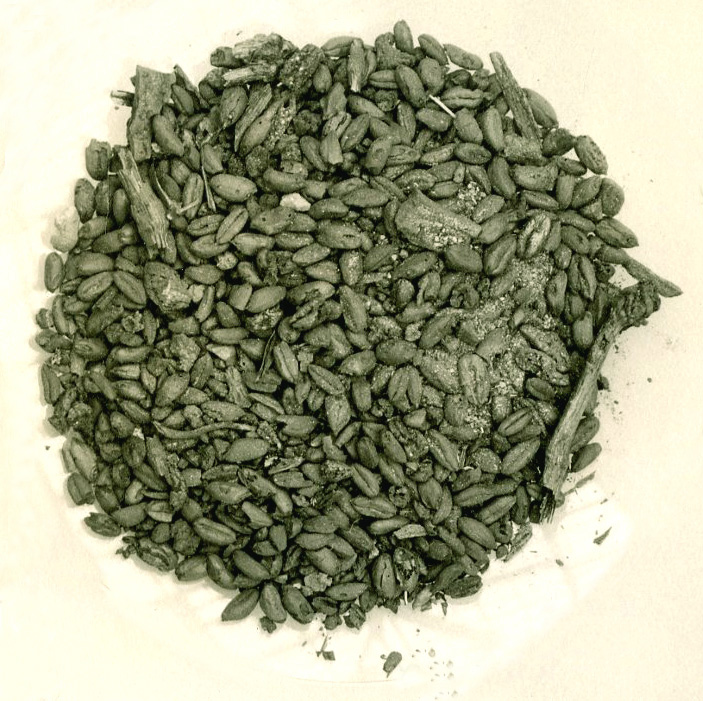
Grain from Merimde, MET

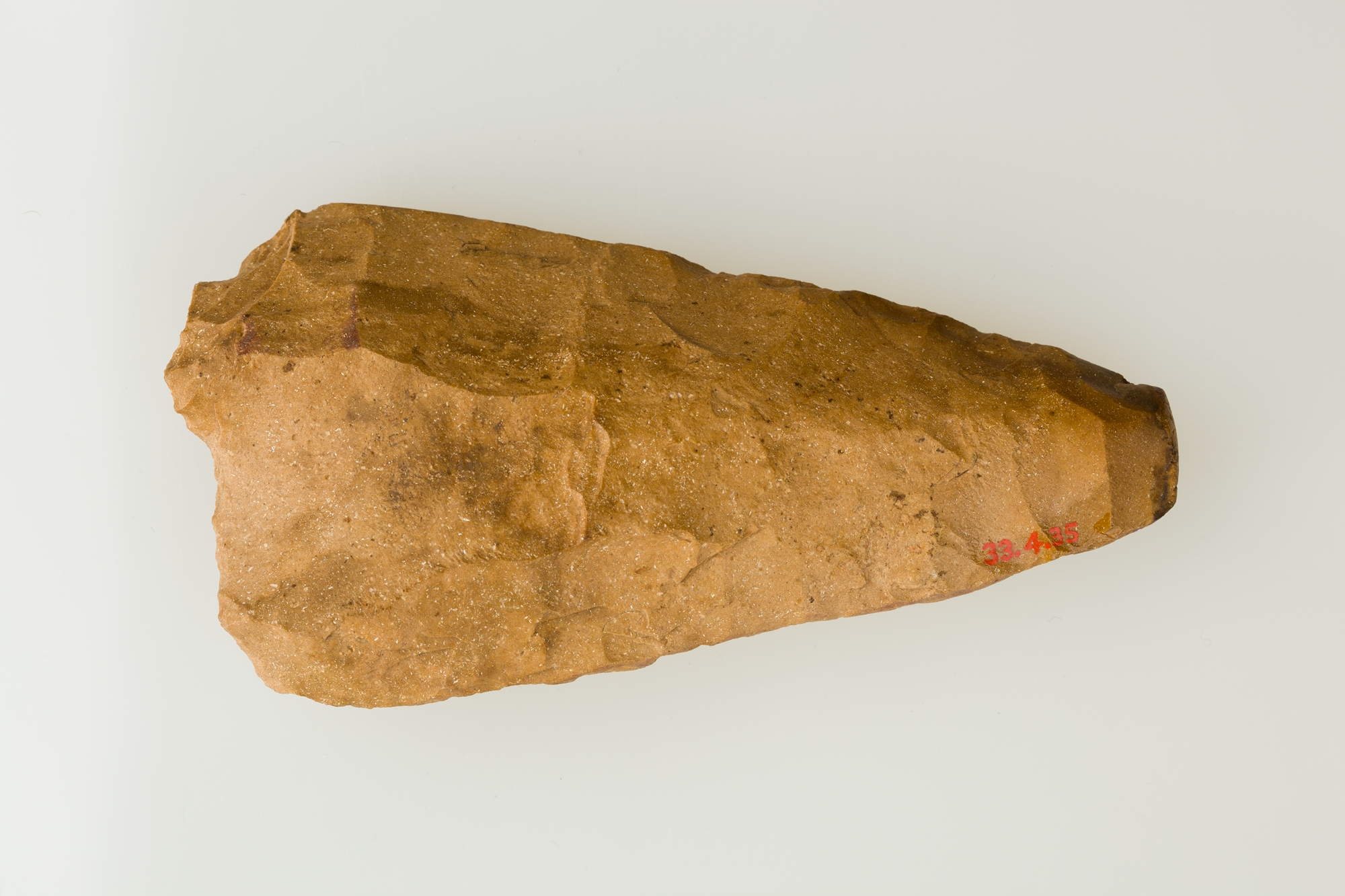
Hand ax, Neolithic Period, Buto–Merimde–Maadi, c. 4500–4000 BC. Western Delta, Egypt

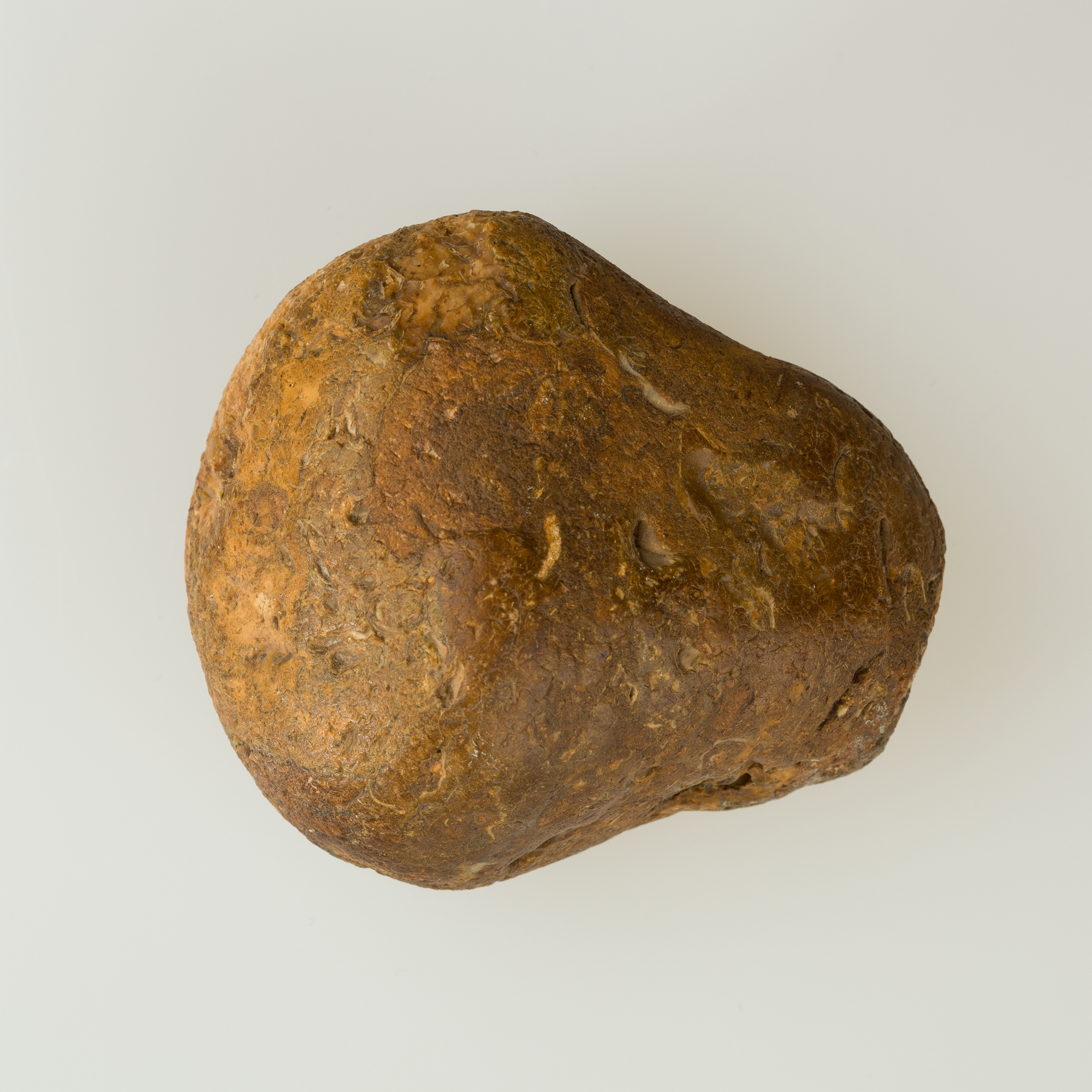
Pounder, Neolithic Period, Buto–Merimda–Maadi, circa 4500 –4000 BC. Western Delta, Egypt.

== See also ==
- Population history of Egypt
