= House Brunton =

Building in Berea, South Africa

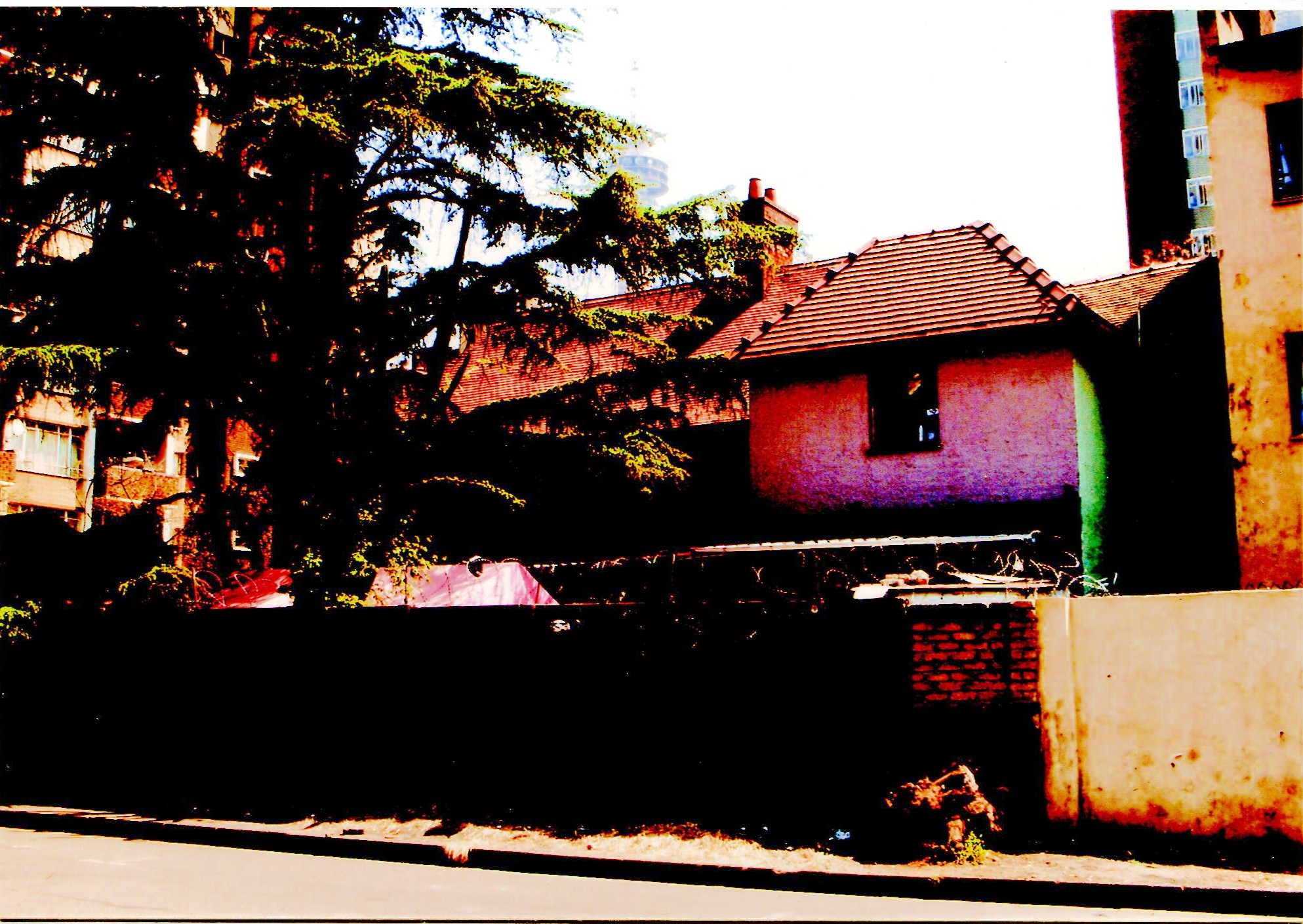
- 21 Primrose and 4 Fife streets

General information
- Status: Completed
- Type: Residential
- Location: Berea, South Africa
- Completed: 1906

Design and construction
- Architect(s): MORRIS & COTTRILL

House Brunton is a residential property in Berea, Johannesburg, South Africa designed by the renowned firm of Henry Seton Morris and Cottrill. The house was completed in 1906 and takes its name from the original occupants, the celebrated painter Winifred Brunton and her husband, Guy Brunton who was an Egyptologist and director of Cairo Museum.

The house is situated on the corner of Primrose Terrace and Fife Street and is currently used as a beer hall. The house has two storeys with a red tile roof and white washed walls.

== Winifred Brunton ==
Winifred Mabel Brunton (née Newberry) was born 6 May 1880 and died 29 January 1959. She was one of three daughters born to Charles and Elizabeth Newberry, who built and lived in the Prynnsberg mansion in Clocolan from the 1880s. Winnifred studied art in South Africa and at the Slade School. She later exhibited at the Royal Academy and was a member of the Royal Society of British Artists and the Royal Miniature Society. She married Guy Brunton (1878-1948), a respected Egyptologist and one-time Assistant Keeper of the Cairo Museum. They retired to South Africa and brought with them a large collection of Egyptian antiquities.

Works by Winifred Brunton include:

- Murals with Egyptian theme, and family miniatures, at Prynnsberg, Clocolan
- Illustrations for the book ‘Kings and Queens of Ancient Egypt’ (1926)
- Illustrations for the book ‘Great Ones of Ancient Egypt’(1929)

== Morris & Cottrill partnership ==
The Morris & Cottrill partnership was a collaboration between Henry Seton Morris and G St J Cottrill in Johannesburg around 1906. Morris was in South Africa for a short period from 1902 to around 1909, when he returned to London. House Brunton is currently the only building known to have been produced by the short-lived Morris and Cottrill partnership.

== Heritage status ==
The House Brunton residence is historically and culturally significant for the following reasons:

- The House Brunton is associated with Winifred Brunton and Guy Brunton, who were notable people in Johannesburg
- The house is the only known building associated with the short-lived practice of Morris & Cottrill
- House Brunton was built in 1906 which makes it old enough to qualify as a heritage house
