= Suty =

Ancient Egyptian high official

Suty was an ancient Egyptian high official under pharaoh Ramesses II. He was overseer of the treasuries – thus responsible for the administration of the commodities coming to the royal palace – and overseer of troops. Suty is known from his decorated tomb at El Khawaled (Mostagedda), in Upper Egypt. He is also known from a sarcophagus that is now in the Cairo Egyptian Museum but most likely comes from this tomb. Shabtis with his name were found in burials of the Apis bulls at Saqqara. They were found close to Apis bulls that were buried in the year 16 and year 30 of the reign of Ramesses II. In year 24 a certain Panehesi was in offices as overseer of the treasuries, before the latter Tia occupied this office, so that Suty must have been in office around year 30 of king Ramesses II. This also indicates that Suty was involved in preparing the burials of these sacred animals. He is also known from several statues.
