= Predynastic Egyptian mummies =

Human bodies preserved from Predynastic Egypt

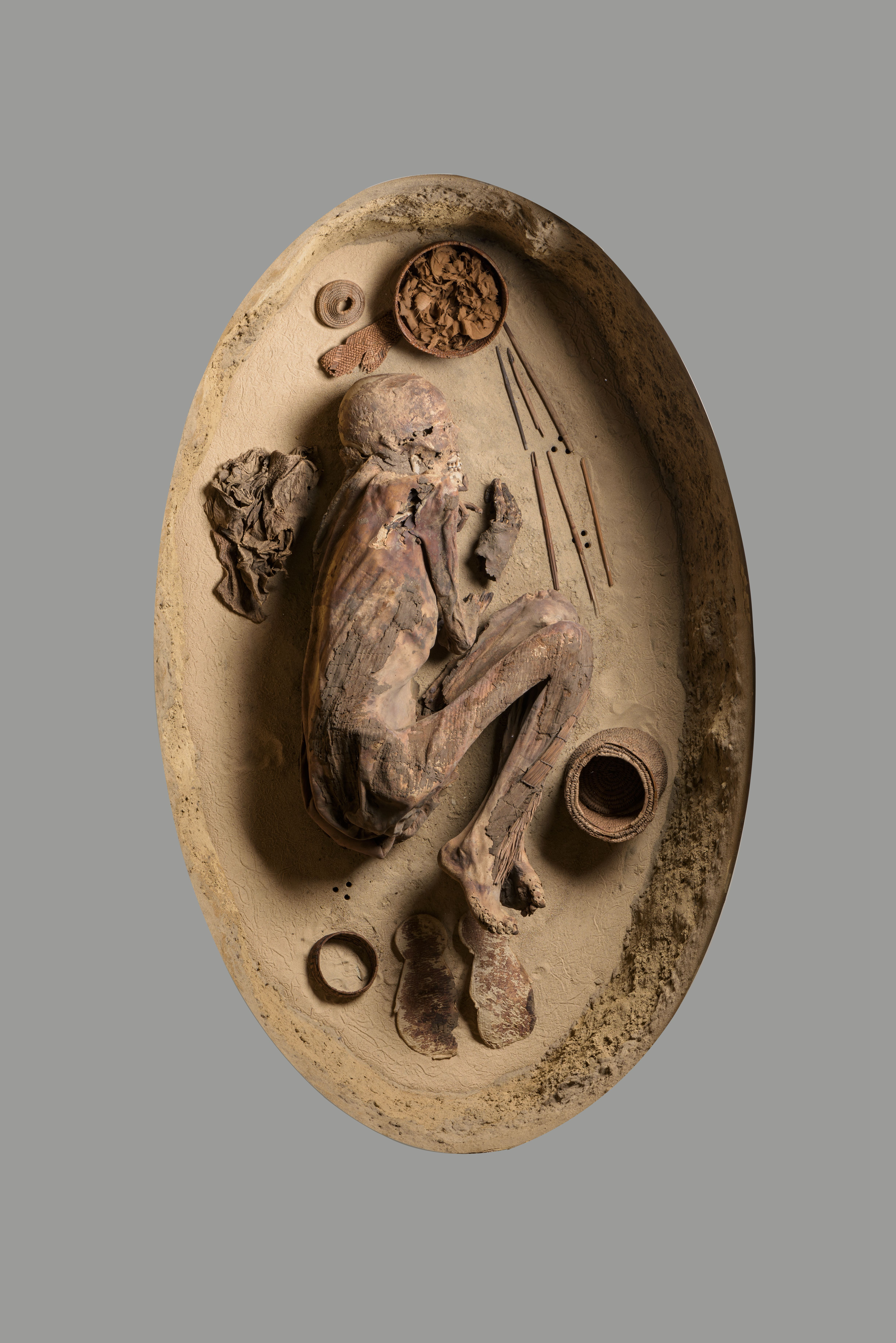
Reconstruction of the burial of mummy S. 293, the naturally mummified body of an adult male, Naqada I, Predynastic period, 3900-3700 BC, Museo Egizio, Turin (Suppl. 293).

Predynastic Egyptian mummies are human bodies preserved either by the burial environment or by early funerary treatments in ancient Egypt before the dynastic period; their main chronological frame is Predynastic Egypt, when funerary practices developed before the full formation of the pharaonic state.

Predynastic mummified remains are held in several museums, including the British Museum, the Museo Egizio in Turin, the Institute for the Study of Ancient Cultures Museum of the University of Chicago, the Field Museum, the Egyptian Museum of Berlin, the Yale Peabody Museum, the University of Pennsylvania Museum of Archaeology and Anthropology and the Musée des Confluences. Known cases include bodies naturally preserved in shallow sand graves and funerary materials treated with organic substances before the dynastic period. Mummy S. 293 in the Museo Egizio dates to the Predynastic period; two textile samples yielded calibrated radiocarbon ranges of 3644-3386 and 3635-3380 BC, corresponding to the Naqada IA-IIB phases. It is considered the oldest known embalmed body: its wrappings provide the first unequivocal scientific evidence, in an extant Predynastic mummy, for embalming agents used in funerary treatment. Its geographical provenance remains unknown.

== Funerary context ==
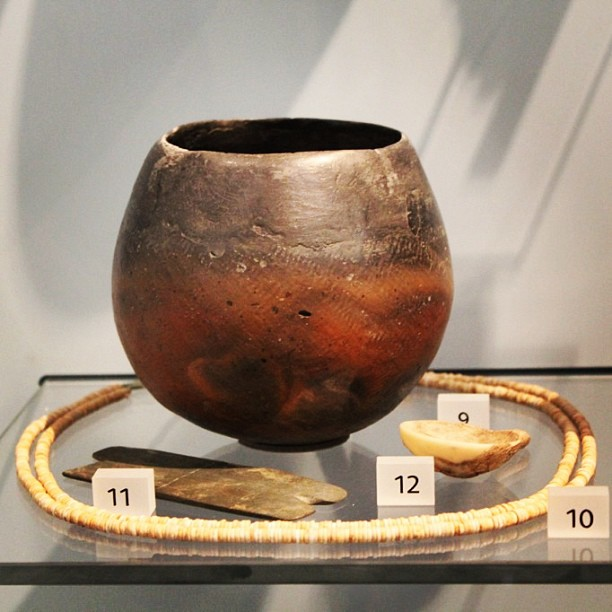
Museum reconstruction of a burial of the Badarian culture, with the body placed in a contracted position.

In the predynastic burials at Gebelein, bodies were placed in shallow sand graves; the dry sand rapidly drew moisture from the corpse, favouring the preservation of soft tissues. At Mostagedda, the samples examined in 2014 came instead from late Neolithic and predynastic pit burials, dated to about 4500-3350 BC. A contracted position is recurrent among the Gebelein bodies, with the knees drawn up and the body laid on the left side: EA 32751 is a young adult male placed in a flexed position on the left side, with the hands in front of the face, while EA 32752 is an adult female, also laid on the left side in a tightly flexed position.

Three of the Gebelein mummies still preserve funerary materials used as coverings or wrappings around the body: EA 32753 has basketry and linen; EA 32755 has traces of wicker, fur and linen on the body surface; EA 32756 preserves bandages at the neck, pelvis and right ankle.

== Natural preservation and intentional treatments ==
Until the biomolecular analyses published in 2014, the survival of soft tissues in prehistoric Egyptian bodies was usually explained mainly by the hot, dry sand of the graves; the beginning of artificial mummification was therefore generally placed much later, in the Old Kingdom of Egypt, around 2500 BC. Chemical analyses of the funerary textiles from Mostagedda showed that, in the late Neolithic and predynastic periods, preparations were already being made from plant oil or animal fat, pine resin, plant gum or sugar, a natural petroleum substance and an aromatic plant extract. Some of these ingredients have antibacterial properties; their presence at points where soft tissues survived suggests, in the authors' interpretation, that some of the substances later used in pharaonic mummification were already in use before the formation of the Egyptian state.

In 2018, analysis of mummy S. 293 in the Museo Egizio in Turin identified an organic mixture on the funerary wrappings, consisting mainly of plant oil or animal fat; smaller amounts of heated conifer resin, plant gum or sugar and aromatic plant extract were also present. Two textile samples from the Turin body yielded calibrated radiocarbon ranges of 3644-3386 and 3635-3380 BC, at a 95.4% probability level, in agreement with the early phases of the Naqada culture. Before these analyses, the specimen had been regarded as a case of natural preservation; the chemical results indicate that at least some wrappings in direct contact with the body had been treated with organic substances.

== Main examples ==
=== Gebelein mummies in the British Museum ===
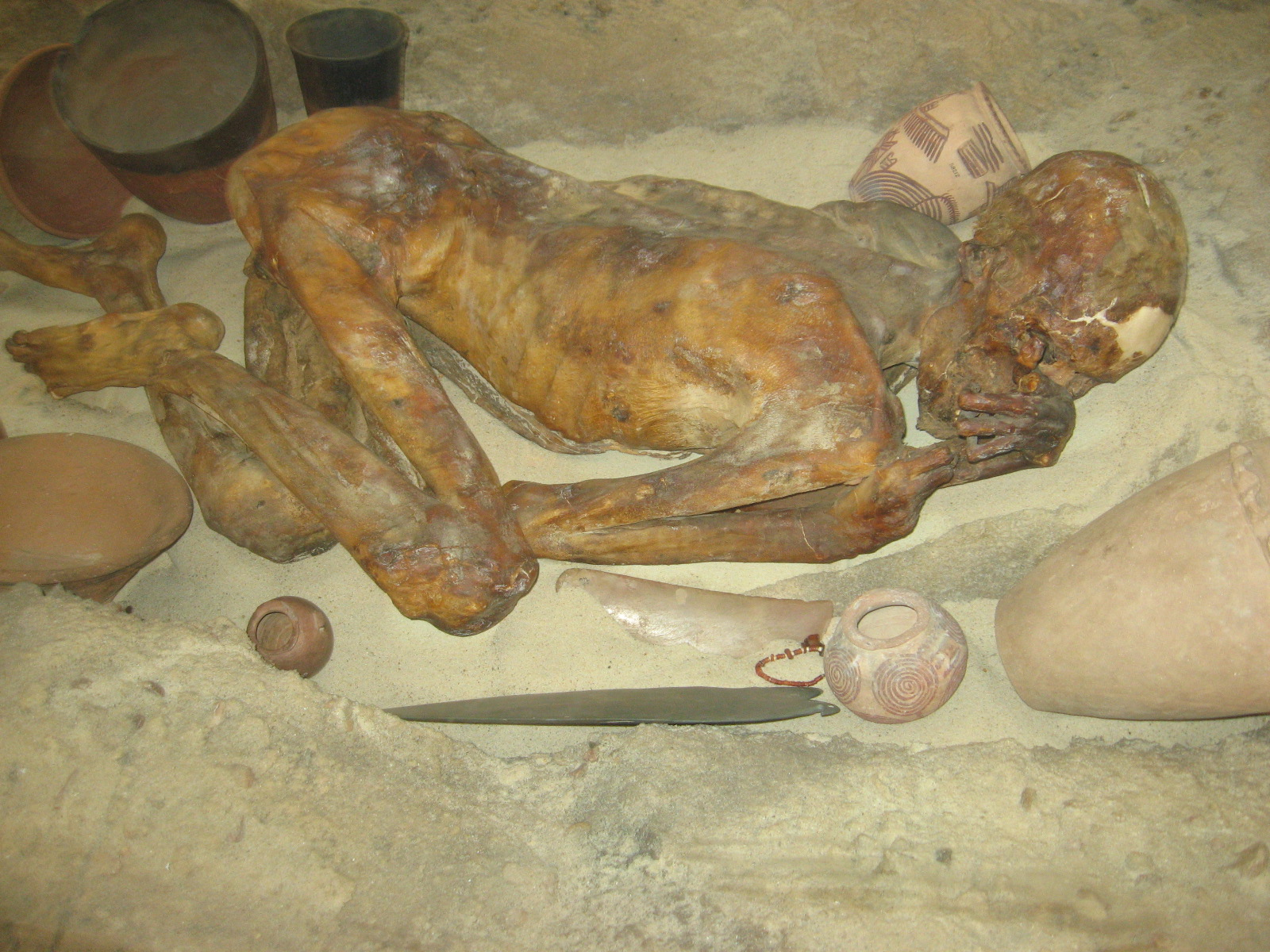
EA 32751, a naturally mummified male body, late Predynastic/Naqada II, about 3400 BC, from Gebelein, British Museum (EA 32751).

The Gebelein group at the British Museum consists of six naturally mummified predynastic bodies from Upper Egypt, acquired by the museum in 1900 after E. A. Wallis Budge removed them in 1896 from shallow sand graves at Baḥr Bila Mâ, near Gebelein. Budge recorded coverings of skin, palm-fibre matting and reed matting for some of the bodies, while the museum records preserve or describe associated remains of basketry, linen, wicker, fur and bandages.

EA 32751, known as Gebelein Man and formerly nicknamed "Ginger" because of the colour of his hair, is the best-known member of the group and was listed on 23 June 2026 as displayed in Room 64, case 15, of the British Museum. The body is dated to about 3400 BC, with a calibrated radiocarbon interval of 3341-3017 BC at a 95.4% probability level; it is 163 cm long, preserves reddish hair on the scalp and has a sharp-force injury in the upper left back. Infrared analyses published in 2018 identified figurative tattoos on EA 32751 and EA 32752. On EA 32751 the mark on the right arm depicts a bovid, probably an aurochs, and a Barbary sheep; EA 32752 bears a crooked staff and four S-shaped motifs on the right arm and shoulder. Radiocarbon dating places the two individuals between 3351 and 3017 BC; their tattoos are the oldest known figurative examples preserved on human bodies. The two individuals are nearly contemporary with Ötzi, whose tattoos, dated to the late fourth millennium BC, are mainly geometric.

=== Mummy S. 293 in the Museo Egizio, Turin ===
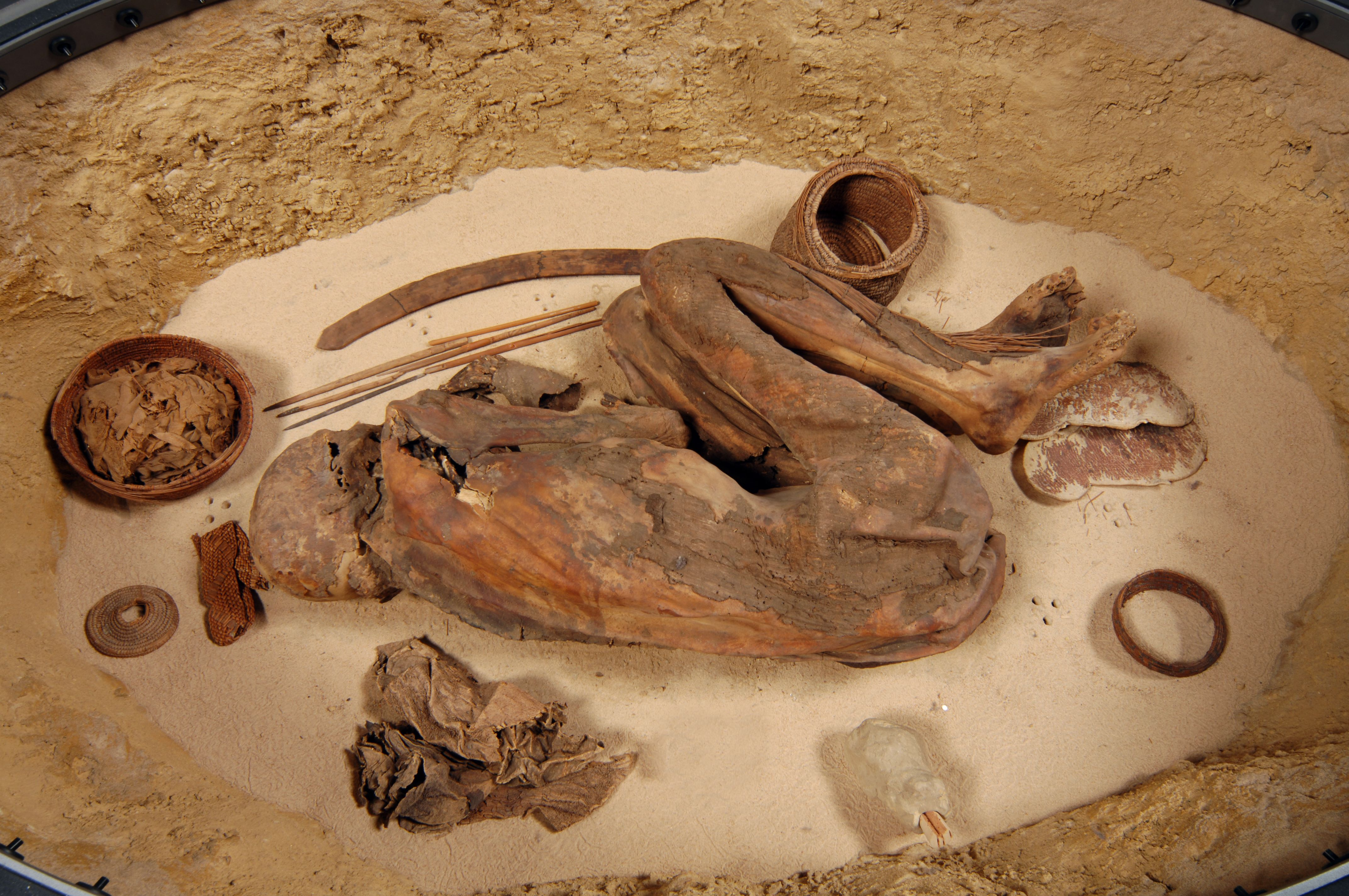
Reconstruction of the burial of mummy S. 293, the naturally mummified body of an adult male, Naqada I, Predynastic period, 3900-3700 BC, Museo Egizio, Turin (Suppl. 293).

Mummy S. 293 is the body of an adult male placed on the left side in a contracted position, 92 cm long and dating to the Predynastic period, Naqada I. It is considered the oldest known embalmed body. Its wrappings provide the first unequivocal scientific evidence, in an extant Predynastic mummy, for embalming agents used in funerary treatment. Two textile samples yielded calibrated radiocarbon ranges of 3644-3386 and 3635-3380 BC, at a 95.4% probability level, placing the specimen in the Naqada IA-IIB phases, about 3700-3500 BC. Its provenance is unknown, and it was acquired by Ernesto Schiaparelli in 1900-1901. For geographical comparison with the Mostagedda textiles, an origin in the area of Gebelein, Qena or Luxor was assumed.

The body was naturally mummified by the burial environment, while some of its wrappings were intentionally treated with organic substances. The mixture identified on the wrappings consisted mainly of plant oil or animal fat, with smaller amounts of heated conifer resin, plant gum or sugar and an aromatic plant extract.

Materials associated with mummy S. 293 include a pair of leather sandals, fragments of a bag, plant-fibre baskets and arrows; it cannot be established, however, whether these objects belonged to the original grave assemblage. The leather sandals (Suppl. 294) are dated to 3900-3300 BC; the ostrich-skin bag fragments (Suppl. 295) are assigned to the same chronological range. The two plant-fibre baskets (Suppl. 296 and Suppl. 297) belong to the same Schiaparelli acquisition and are dated to 3900-3300 BC; wooden arrows (Suppl. 298/01 and Suppl. 298/02) are also associated with S. 293.

Materials associated with mummy S. 293, Museo Egizio, Turin

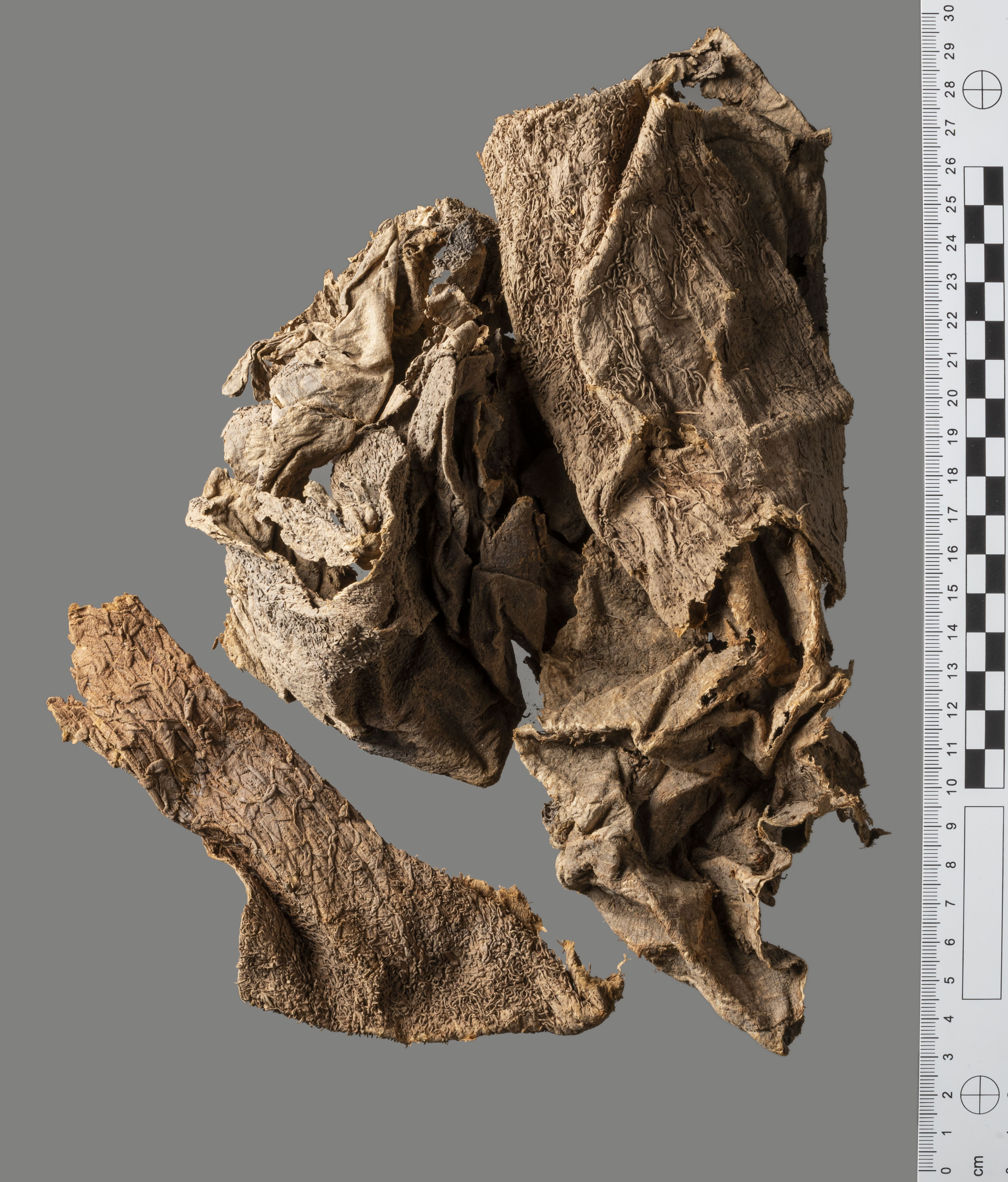
Fragments of an ostrich-skin bag, Predynastic period, 3900-3300 BC (Suppl. 295).

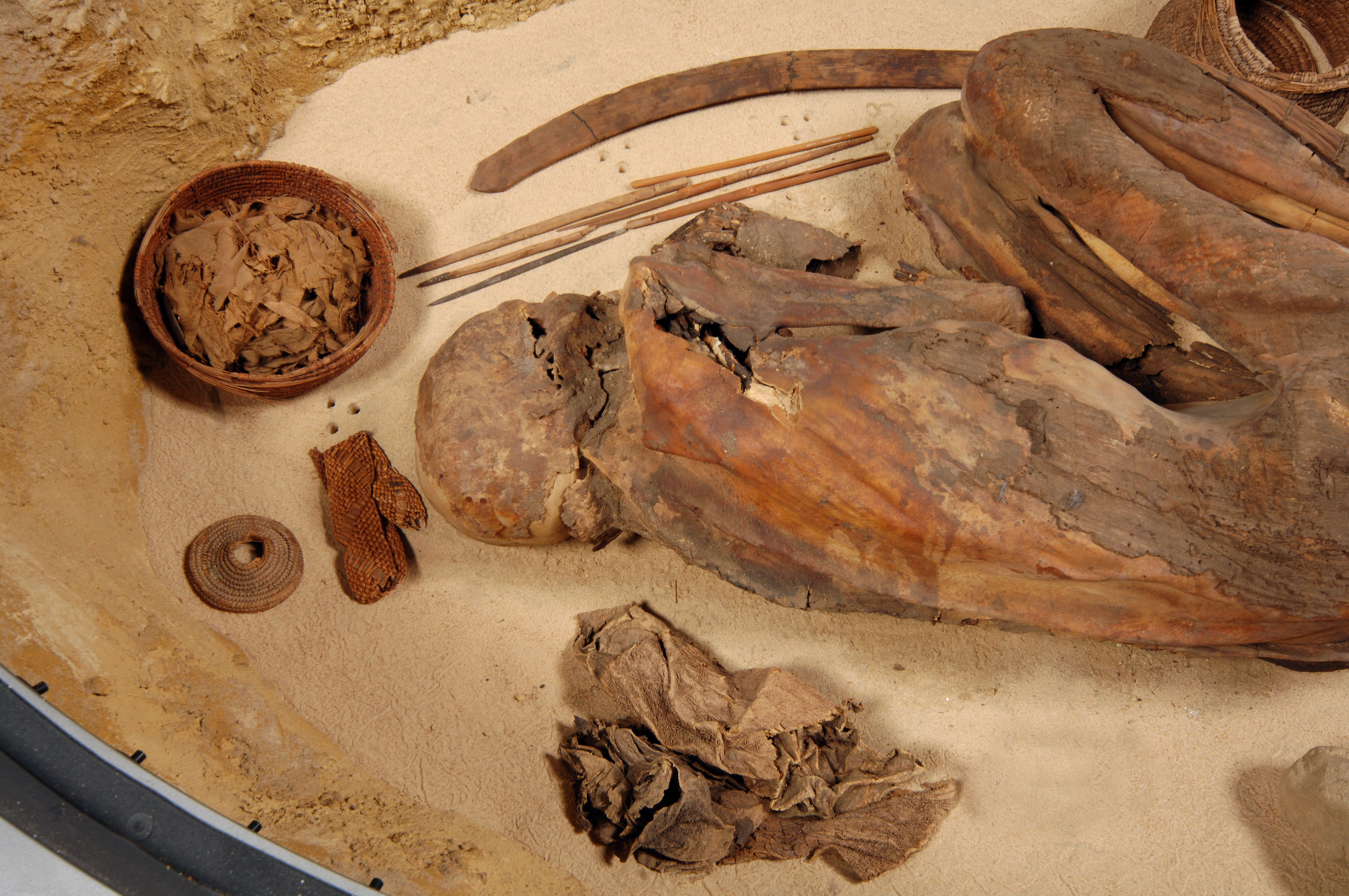
Detail of the reconstructed burial of mummy S. 293, with a wooden arrow associated with the body (Suppl. 298/01).

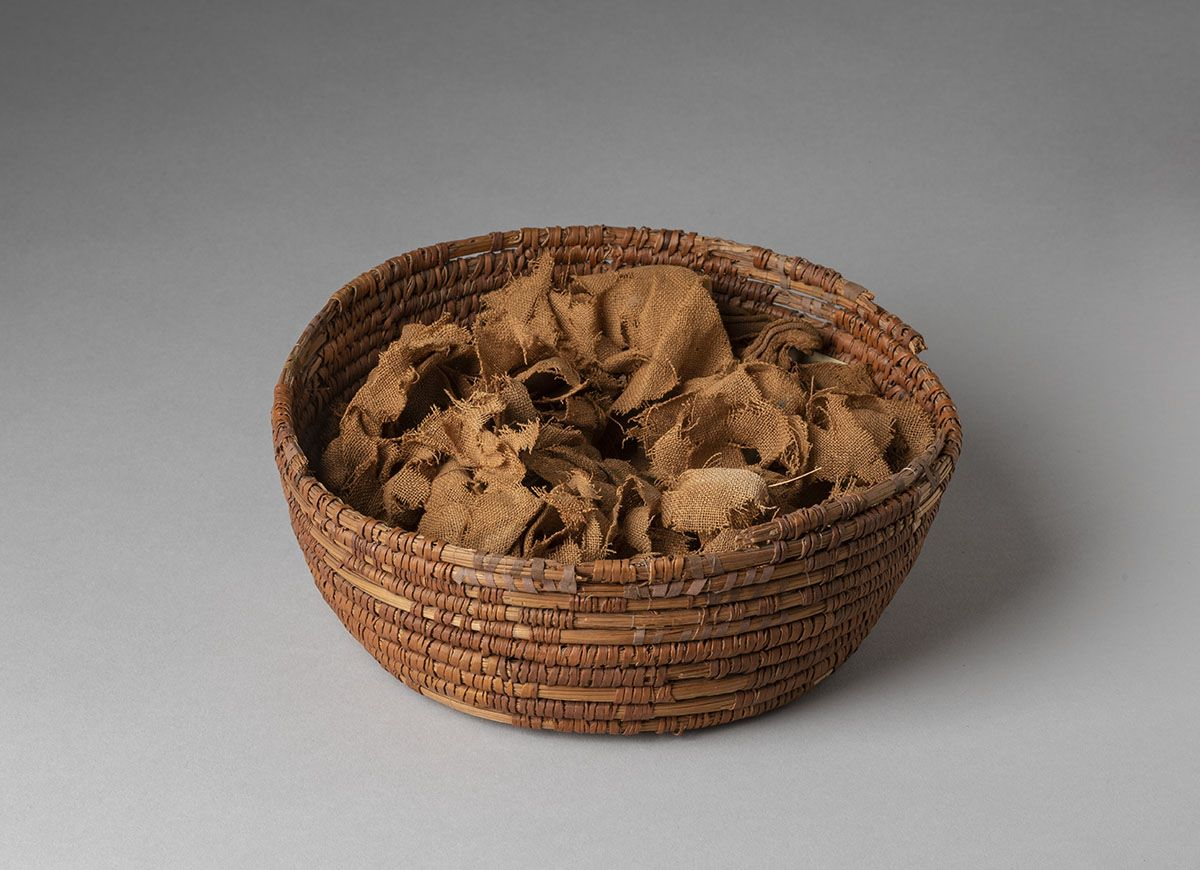
Basket of plant fibre and linen associated with mummy S. 293 (Suppl. 302).

=== Mostagedda, Hierakonpolis and other predynastic bodies ===
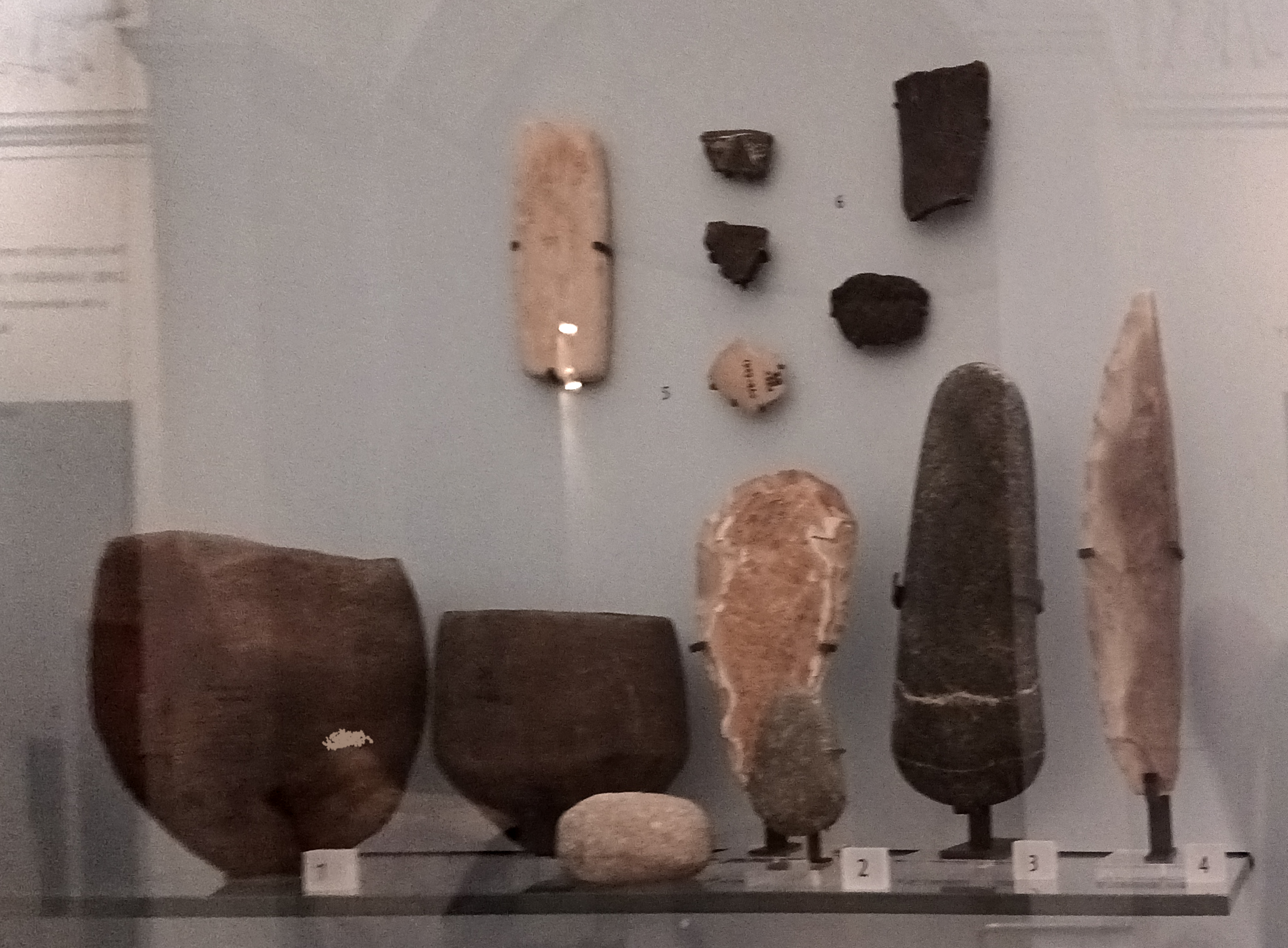
Badarian materials from Mostagedda and Matmar in a display case at the Ashmolean Museum; Mostagedda is one of the sites from which the funerary textiles analysed in 2014 came.

In 2014, funerary textiles from pit burials at Mostagedda, in the Badarian region of Upper Egypt, were chemically analysed. The samples belonged to burials of the Badarian culture and to predynastic burials dated to about 4500-3350 BC; "Badarian" designates an Upper Egyptian culture preceding the full Naqada phase. The analyses identified organic substances in linen wrappings, leather and plant mats; their composition corresponds to preparations intentionally applied to the funerary materials. Earlier observations of resin-like substances at Hierakonpolis were based on physical appearance, not on direct biochemical analyses.

Other prehistoric Egyptian bodies are held outside Egypt, in European and American museums: in addition to the six Gebelein bodies in the British Museum and the Turin mummy, these include a body from Naga el-Deir displayed at the Institute for the Study of Ancient Cultures Museum of the University of Chicago, a specimen in the Field Museum in Chicago, five bodies of unknown provenance in the Egyptian Museum of Berlin, a woman of unknown provenance in the Yale Peabody Museum, two bodies in the University of Pennsylvania Museum of Archaeology and Anthropology possibly from a predynastic cemetery near Nagaa Qamula and three bodies in the Musée des Confluences from Roda and Gebelein.

== Scientific analyses ==
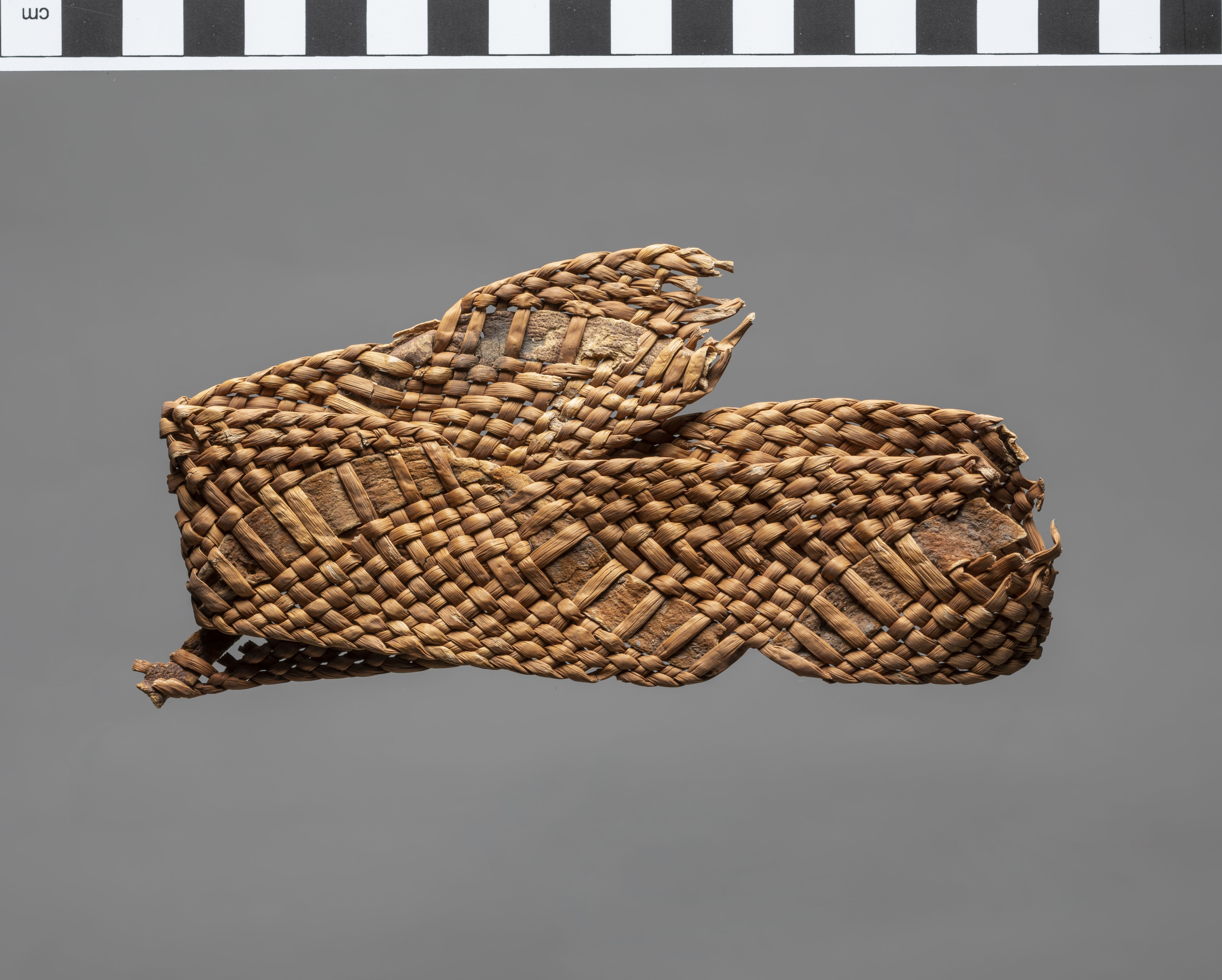
Braid of plant fibre, animal organic material and leather associated with mummy S. 293, Predynastic period, 3900-3300 BC, Museo Egizio, Turin (Suppl. 303).

The study of predynastic bodies uses both non-destructive examinations and analyses of samples taken from funerary materials. For the Gebelein mummies, computed tomography, observations on the bones and descriptions of soft tissues help distinguish injuries that occurred before death from damage after death and assess the preservation of the tissues. Infrared imaging made tattoos invisible or barely visible in ordinary light legible on two naturally mummified individuals; radiocarbon dates for EA 32751 and EA 32752 place the two tattooed individuals between 3351 and 3017 BC, at a 95.4% probability level.

Analyses of mummy S. 293 in Turin included direct observation, sampling of textiles, microscopy, radiocarbon dating, gas chromatography-mass spectrometry, thermal desorption and pyrolysis coupled with gas chromatography-mass spectrometry, as well as shotgun metagenomics, an analysis of the DNA present in a sample without first selecting a single gene. The fragile condition of the Turin body prevented radiographic investigation, because the mummy could not be removed from its display case without risk of damage. The substances extracted from the wrappings of S. 293 were dominated by degraded lipids, that is, fats altered over time, with components attributed to plant oil or animal fat, conifer resin, plant gum or sugar and aromatic plant extract. For S. 293, dated to the Naqada IA-IIB phases, about 3700-3500 BC, the application of substances in the funerary treatment of the body has been chemically identified; the specimen is therefore the earliest preserved case of a predynastic Egyptian mummy with evidence of this kind.

== Museum history and display ==
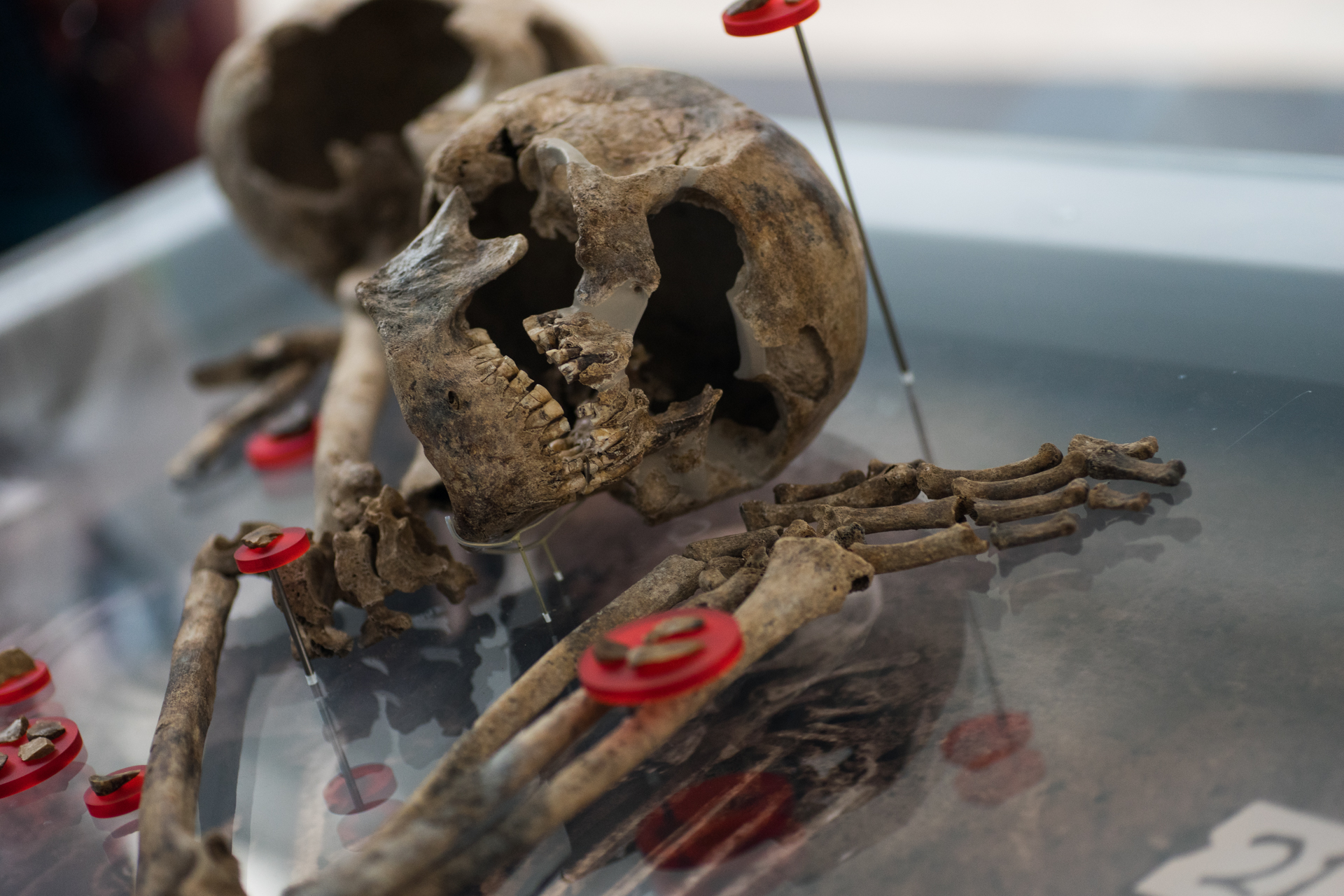
Room 64 of the British Museum, devoted to early Egypt; EA 32751 is displayed in the same room, 2015.

Displayed in the British Museum since 1901, EA 32751 was listed on 23 June 2026 in Room 64, devoted to ancient Egypt, case 15. The display presents it in a reconstructed sand grave, with funerary objects from similar burials rather than from the original grave goods recorded by Budge. For EA 32752, no public display location was indicated on the same date; the body was, however, included in the exhibition Ancient Faces in Rome in 1997-1998 and in Egypt Revealed in Birmingham in 2001.

Mummy S. 293 in the Museo Egizio in Turin is located in Room 2, case 1, together with objects associated with it or from the same predynastic acquisition. Museum archives did not record modern conservation treatments capable of explaining the organic substances identified on the wrappings. The display of human remains in museums also raises ethical questions. The British Museum holds more than 6,000 human remains for display and research and states that they are cared for and presented to the public with respect and dignity. In 2019, the Museo Egizio held a conference on the ethics, conservation and display of human remains and conducted a public survey on their exhibition in museums.

== Sources ==
- Budge, Ernest Alfred Thompson Wallis (1920). By Nile and Tigris: A Narrative of Journeys in Egypt and Mesopotamia on Behalf of the British Museum between the Years 1886 and 1913. Vol. 2. London: John Murray.
- Friedman, Renée; Antoine, Daniel; Talamo, Sahra; Reimer, Paula J.; Taylor, John H.; Wills, Barbara; Mannino, Marcello A. (April 2018). "Natural mummies from Predynastic Egypt reveal the world's earliest figural tattoos" (PDF). Journal of Archaeological Science. 92: 116–125. doi:10.1016/j.jas.2018.02.002. ISSN 0305-4403.
- Jones, Jana; Higham, Thomas F. G.; Oldfield, Ron; O'Connor, Terry P.; Buckley, Stephen A. (August 2014). "Evidence for Prehistoric Origins of Egyptian Mummification in Late Neolithic Burials". PLOS ONE. 9 (8) e103608. doi:10.1371/journal.pone.0103608. ISSN 1932-6203. PMC 4132097.
- Jones, Jana; Higham, Thomas F. G.; Chivall, David; Bianucci, Raffaella; Kay, Gemma L.; Pallen, Mark J.; Oldfield, Ron; Ugliano, Federica; Buckley, Stephen A. (December 2018). "A prehistoric Egyptian mummy: Evidence for an 'embalming recipe' and the evolution of early formative funerary treatments" (PDF). Journal of Archaeological Science. 100: 191–200. doi:10.1016/j.jas.2018.07.011. ISSN 0305-4403.

== See also ==
- Gebelein predynastic mummies
- Mummy
- Mummification
- British Museum
- Museo Egizio
- Predynastic Egypt
