= Prynnsberg Estate =

19th-century manor in South Africa

Prynnsberg was a manor built between 1881 and 1884 in Clocolan, Free State, South Africa, by Charles Newberry (1841–1922) who immigrated to South Africa in 1864 as a carpenter to join his older brother John, mining in Greytown and eventually gained enough holdings in the Kimberly diamond mining industry to stop actively mining and build his mansion. Charles's daughter was Winifred Brunton.

== Pre-Prynnsberg years ==
When the Kimberly Mines opened in 1872, Charles Newberry spent seven years digging in the hottest Kimberly weather for diamonds gaining enough hold to be a shareholder in Cecil Rhodes Central Mining Company, which became De Beers. By the time Cecil Rhodes came to consolidate all the independent claims in the Big Hole to create De Beers Charles Newberry and his brother John had built up a substantial holding in "the big hole". When Rhodes's consolidation came about in 1879 Charles Newberry found himself free to pursue other ventures while John became a director of the newly formed De Beers. Having met and fallen in love with the daughter of a Lesotho-based missionary (Elizabeth Daniel daughter of the Rev John Daniel) while on a trip through the Eastern Free State he decided to make the Eastern Free State his home and along with his new wife set about the fulfilment of his dream of creating a classic English country estate in the wilds of Africa. Having purchased the foundation of the estate from a man named Prynn he christened his venture Prynnsberg in 1881. The estate – which in its heyday covered over 20,000 hectares of land lies on the edge of the Maluti Mountains under a sandstone cliff in the Thaba Nchu District.

== Building Prynnsberg ==
The house began as additions to the original single story farmhouse and became a three-story, 20-room manor, constructed of finely crafted sandstone in the African veld. The estate included two churches, a vicarage, a gamekeepers' lodge, stables and various outbuildings. The house was built in old-world grandeur, becoming a national gem and, was decorated by the London firm James Shoolbred and Company of Tottenham Court Road. Prynnsberg includes enormous rooms of gold leaf and flocked wallpapers, intricate oak parquet, pressed leather panelling, rococo plaster ceilings, gilded cornices, elaborate tiled fireplaces, leaded windows and teak doors with Victorian stained glass and flamboyant friezes. Also there was a 700-Volt D.C. Dynamo which supplied power to the lathes refrigerator for the Cold Room where fruit from the orchard was stored.

== Prynnsberg artefacts and paintings ==
Approximately between 1884 and 1900, Charles and his wife Elizabeth collected local cultural art, which were housed in a private museum. Most of the items were 19th century, including arguably the world's finest Nguni /Zulu sculpture and other Southern Bantu tribal items. The entirety of the collection came from Zulu, Xhosa, Venda, Sotho, Ndebele, Tsonga, Northern Nguni, and related peoples. The many Egyptian artefacts around the Prynnsberg estate came from the well-known English Egyptologist Guy Brunton who was married to Charles' oldest daughter Winifred. Winifred Brunton who has also made a name for herself through her art created many murals and paintings within the house.

== The golden years ==
During Prynnsberg's greatest years, when Charles still was head of the household, there were as many as 17 Europeans employed on the estate including a horticulturist, forester, tutor, two farm managers, stone cutters, masons and others. The estate often housed travellers of similar rank and guests such as: Lord Milner, the Duke of Westminster, President Steyn and Rudyard Kipling, who painted a frieze of Noah's ark in the night nursery. Amazingly, during the Boer War of 1899 to 1902, when Charles and his family moved back to Surrey, England for the duration, the estate was left unharmed, amongst the other farm burnings and destruction. mcdonalds wifi wayport_access

== Charles Newberry's will ==
In an attempt to save the estate for future generations Charles Newberry invoked a South African inheritance clause that left the estate to the eldest son of the fourth generation to follow him ('fidae comissium').

What this amounted to was that the four generations to follow him would be merely trustees of the estate – on behalf of a yet to be born inheritor.

In his own mind Charles Newberry must have thought that the extent of the wealth he would be leaving behind would be more than enough to sustain the four generations that followed. This was not the case. Elizabeth Newberry outlived Charles by some eight years. By the time she passed the estate onto their eldest son Ernest (their first born John Daniel – twin to Amie – having been killed in a World War 1 flying accident) the substantial family holding in De Beers shares was gone, as was seemingly any working capital.

Herein lies the key to Prynnsberg's neglect over the generations that followed. Living in a vast house surrounded by the likes of Chippendale furniture and a priceless collection of art, antiques and rare artefacts but with no working capital, they found themselves trapped in a gilded cage.

Ernests' son Edgar (second generation inheritor) was recorded to have said that he "couldn't stand the place". Plagued by an addiction to alcohol – like his father and mother – his son Trevor proved to be the least capable of all at sustaining any sort of control over the crumbling estate. By the time Trevor Newberry died intestate of an alcohol-induced end in the late 1980s Charles Newberry's Prynnsberg dream lay in tatters.

== Inheritance Breach ==
The true line of inheritance should have been as follows: Charles Newberry I, Edgar Edward Newberry, Trevor Newberry (no heirs), then back to Peter Newberry, then his son Robin Newberry, to Charles Newberry and then John Newberry. Due to the corrupt nationalist government of South Africa, the four-generation trust of the original will of Charles Newberry was allowed to be broken. The oldest son of the third generation, Trevor Newberry had no heir, yet instead of the inheritance passing on to the next male heir, Peter Newberry and through him, his son Robin, nationalist law caused the manor to pass back up the line to relatives of Trevor Newberry. Therefore, the four-generation trust was broken, leaving the true heir with nothing and Sotheby's was brought to auction everything in the bankrupt house in 1994. The much-anticipated auction was held in 1996. Aged family heirlooms and portraits were carried off like prizes, but luckily, the over 300 cultural items held in the museum were purchased together by Ed Smith and shipped to a museum in San Diego before the general auction took place. The current owner of Prynnsberg, which has been restored, is Rick Melvill, and the estate has been able to gain back some of its charm of the old days.
