= Gebelein predynastic mummies =

Six mummified bodies from predynastic Egypt

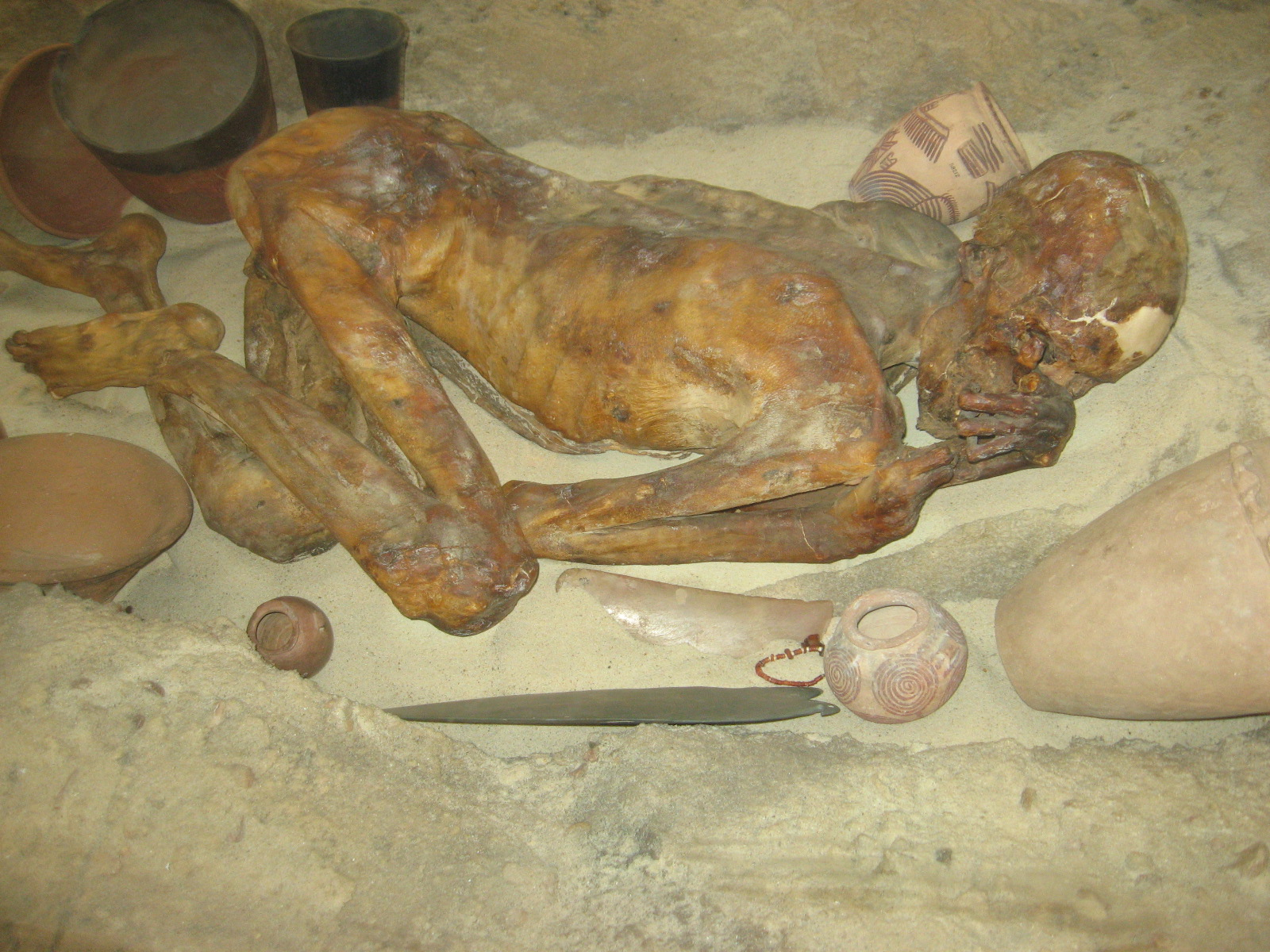
- EA 32751 in a reconstructed sand grave at the British Museum
- Size: EA 32751: 1.63 metres (5 ft 4 in)
- Created: Late Predynastic period c. 3400 BC
- Discovered: 1896; Gebelein (now Naga el-Gherira)
- Discovered by: E. A. Wallis Budge
- Present location: British Museum, London
- Identification: EA 32751–EA 32756
- Culture: Predynastic Egypt

The Gebelein predynastic mummies are six naturally mummified human bodies from Gebelein in Upper Egypt, dating to the Late Predynastic period of Ancient Egypt. The best known of the group, EA 32751, is dated to Naqada II, c. 3400 BC, with a calibrated radiocarbon range of 3341–3017 BC at 95.4% probability.

The bodies were excavated in 1896 by Wallis Budge, then Keeper of Egyptian and Assyrian Antiquities at the British Museum, from shallow sand graves at Baḥr Bila Mâ, on the eastern slopes of the northernmost hill at Gebelein. They were acquired by the British Museum in 1900.

Two of the bodies are identified as male and one as female; the sex of the others is uncertain. Some grave goods were documented at the time of excavation as "pots and flints", but they were not acquired by the British Museum and their later whereabouts are unknown. Three of the bodies retain coverings or wrappings of different kinds, including basketry, linen, wicker, fur, and bandages. The bodies were buried in flexed positions, generally lying on their left sides.

The first body excavated, EA 32751, has been on public display in the British Museum since 1901. The museum's current display places it in a reconstructed sand grave in Room 64, case 15; the object record describes ginger-coloured hair on the scalp and a penetrating wound to the upper left back. Infrared imaging published in 2018 identified figural tattoos on EA 32751 and on the female body EA 32752, making them among the earliest known figurative tattoos preserved on human skin.

== Excavation ==
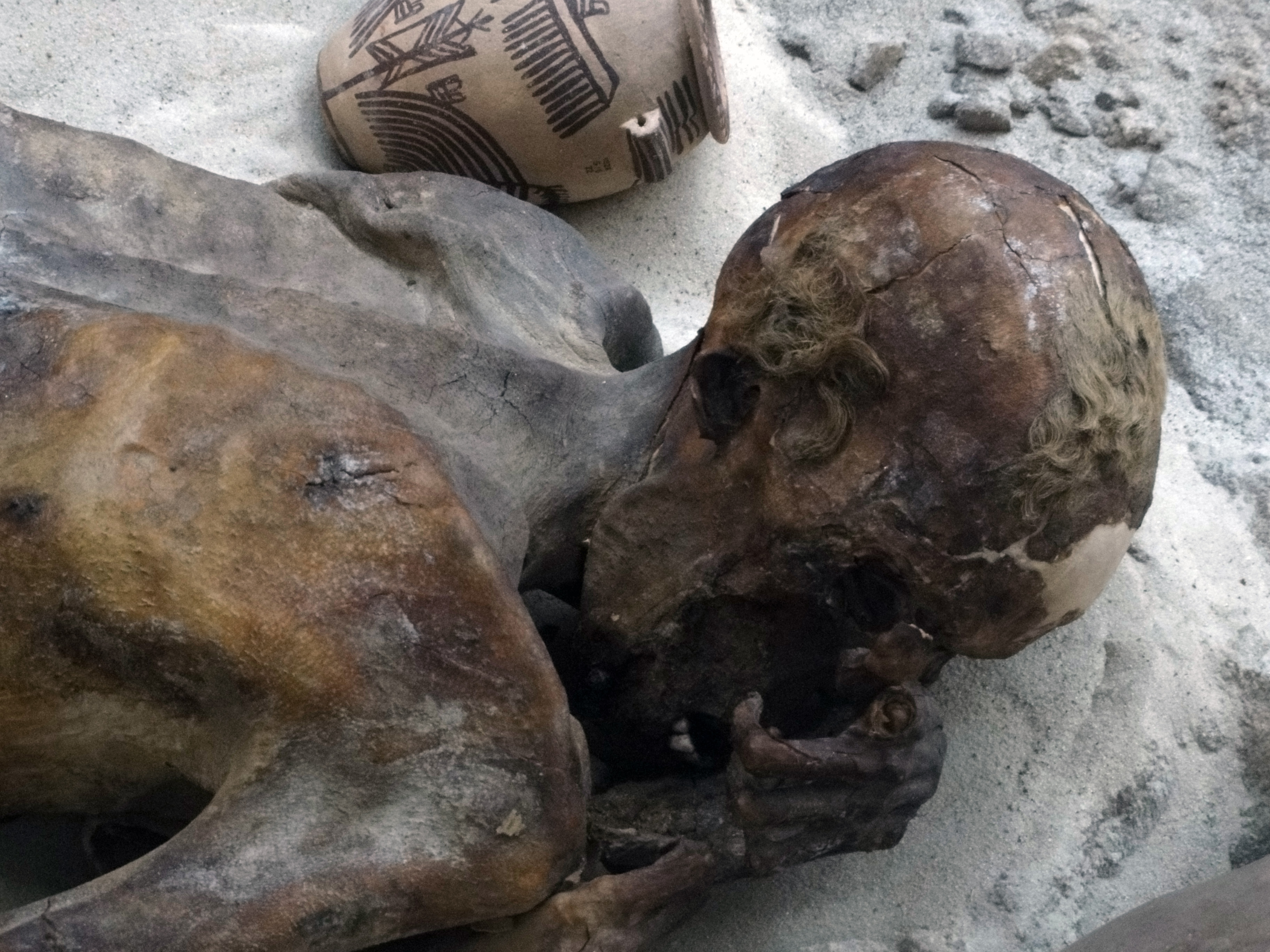
The head of EA 32751 showing the preserved hair. Photo taken in 2011.

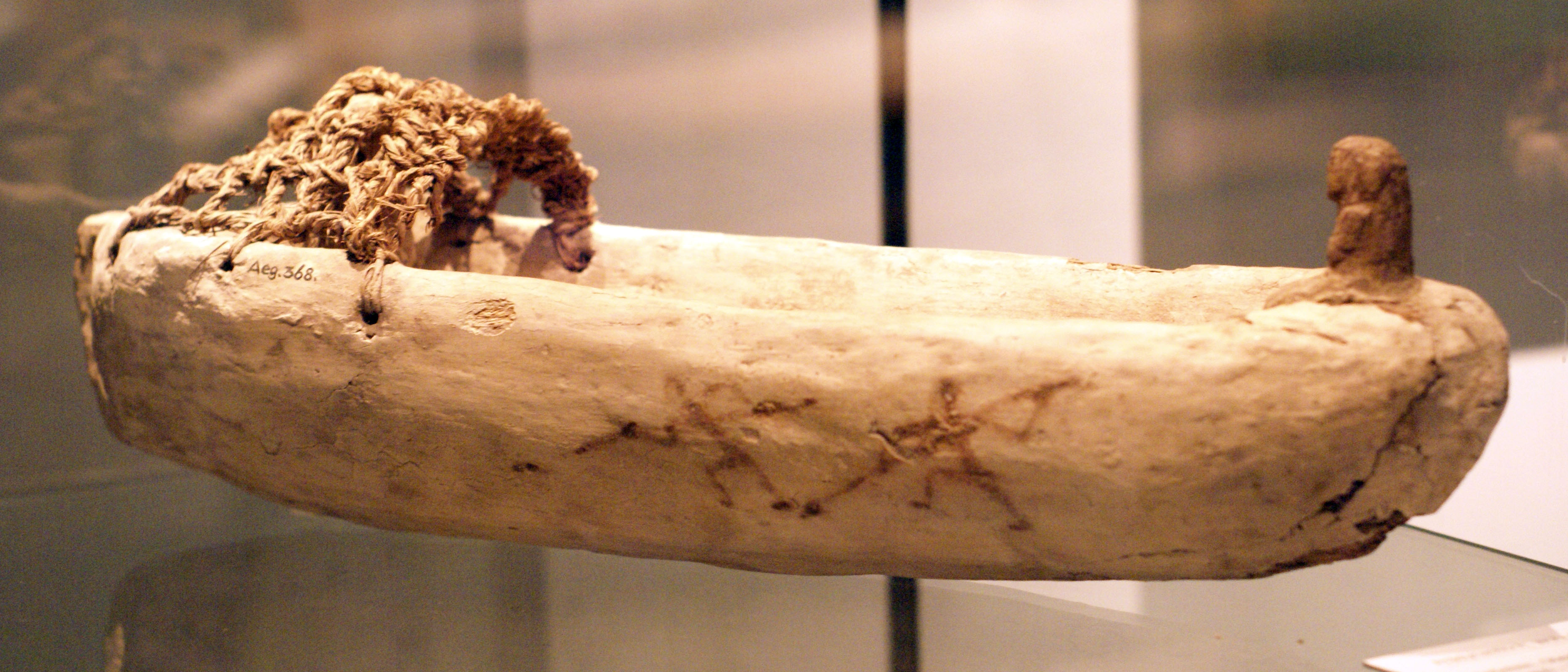
Model of a boat found at Gebelein dated to 3400–3200 BC. Historical Museum of Bern, ref. AE 368.

In 1895 and 1896 the ruins at Abydos, Tukh, Hierakonpolis and Gebelein were excavated. In 1892 Jacques de Morgan, Director of Antiquities in Egypt, proved that pottery found at Abydos and Nakadah pre-dated the dynastic period, stimulating interest by many European archaeologists. As each excavation was completed, local Egyptian residents would continue to search the sites for remains. In 1895 E. A. Wallis Budge, on behalf of the British Museum, procured inscribed coffins and funerary furniture from the 12th Dynasty tombs at Al-Barshah by working with the Egyptian Service of Antiquities. Budge started purchasing predynastic finds from the locals including bowls, spear and arrowheads, carved flint and bone figures and partial human remains (described as chiefly bones without skin or flesh remaining).

In 1896, Budge was approached by a resident of Gebelein who claimed to have found more mummies. Budge was taken to the bodies, and he immediately recognized them as from the predynastic period and the first complete pre-dynastic bodies identified. He began excavations and a total of six mummified bodies were removed from shallow sand graves at Baḥr Bila Mâ (Waterless River) located at the eastern slopes of the north-most hill at Gebelein.

The only grave goods were a pot found with the female adult body and partial remains of wicker, fur and linen with the other bodies. In the predynastic period bodies were usually buried naked and sometimes loosely wrapped. In such a burial, when the body is covered in warm sand, the environmental conditions mean that most of the water in the body is quickly evaporated or drained away, meaning that the corpse is naturally dried and preserved. This method was widely used in the pre-dynastic Egyptian period, before artificial mummification was developed. The natural mummification that occurred with these dry sand burials may have led to the original Egyptian belief in an after-death survival and started the tradition of leaving food and implements for an afterlife.

All bodies were in similar flexed positions lying on their left sides with knees raised up towards their chin. In comparison, most bodies excavated from Egypt dating to the predynastic period are in a similar position, however at Merimda Beni Salama and El-Amra bodies were found on their right sides. From the time these bodies were buried up until the Middle Kingdom period, the dead were laid on their sides. After this period they were buried on their backs (dorsal position), and from the Fifth Dynasty the bodies were always fully extended.

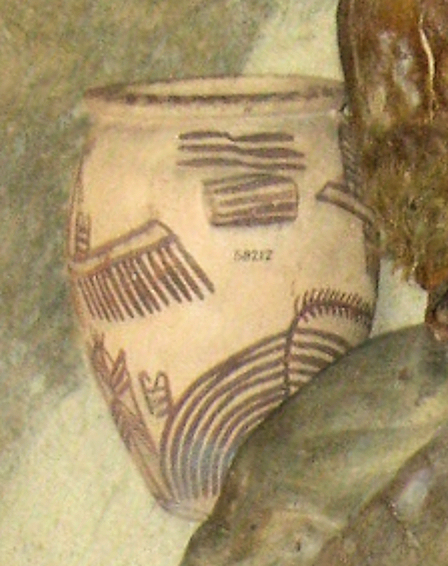
Naqada II decorated jar, next to the mummy

Archaeological interest in Gebelein started in the early 18th century and was included in Benoît de Maillet's Description de l'Egypte. The site includes the remains from a temple to the deity Hathor with a number of cartouches on mud bricks and a royal stela from the 2nd Dynasty and 3rd Dynasty. Later period finds include 400 Demotic and Greek ostraca from a 2nd–1st century BC mercenary garrison. As well as official excavations, many artefacts from the site were traded on the antiquities market and can be found in the museums of Turin, Cairo, Berlin, Lyons and the British Museum.

== Description ==
The bodies were buried in separate shallow graves, placed in the fetal position (knees raised towards their heads), which was the most common form for Egyptian burials of the time.

In 1967, a series of X-rays and photographs of all mummified bodies in the British Museum's Egyptian Antiquities collection provided a detailed analysis of the mummies from the Gebelein excavations. The findings are summarized below:

Id	Length	Age and sex	Findings summary
32751	1.63 metres (5.3 feet)	Male adult	This male adult body has all teeth present and healthy and there are tufts of ginger-coloured hair on the scalp. There are fractures to the ribs, right pubic ring, both thigh bones, shin and calf bones but there is no evidence of arthritis. The left index finger and several of the last toe bones are missing.
32752	1.51 metres (5.0 feet)	Female adult	This is a female adult body with fractures to the skull and many other bone fractures occurring after death, however, the bones are otherwise healthy. There is long brown hair present on the scalp.
32753	1.49 metres (4.9 feet)	Adolescent, sex uncertain	This body of an adolescent has a detached skull that may not belong to the body. The teeth are worn and there are fractures in all ribs, left tibia and right thigh bone. There are lines of arrested growth in the tibia. Linen has been used to pack the thorax and abdomen.
32754	1.6 metres (5.2 feet)	Male adult	This is a male adult body with a square-shaped opacity in the skull and healthy teeth. The body has fractures in the 9th rib, the right femur and a crack fracture left of the sciatic notch. Several of the fingers are missing and the hand has been detached at the wrist. Tufts of brown hair are on the remains of the scalp.
32755	1.52 metres (5.0 feet)	Elderly adult, sex uncertain	This elderly body has decalcified bones, consistent with senile osteoporosis. The body was probably in a wicker basket and covered with animal skin as wicker and fur remnants are present and there are patches of linen on the body surface. All teeth are present with caps worn. The body has many fractured ribs and only wrist bones of the left hand remain. The legs have been detached due to fractures mid-shaft of both thigh bones. There are lines of arrested growth in the tibia and the last bones of most toes are missing.
32756	1.51 metres (5.0 feet)	Adult, probably male	This adult body has remnants of bandages at the neck, pelvis and right ankle. The skull has been detached with some incisors missing but the remaining teeth appear healthy. The body has fractures in the ribs and left femur. One arm has been dislocated at the elbow joint, the left hand is detached at the wrist and both feet are also detached from the rest of the body.

The first body excavated, EA 32751, has ginger-coloured hair on the scalp and was formerly nicknamed "Ginger". The British Museum's current collection record identifies the body by its museum number and as "Gebelein Man".

=== Death of Gebelein Man ===
In 2012 a CT scan of EA 32751 showed that the individual was a young adult male, probably aged between 18 and 23 years. The scan revealed a penetrating wound in the upper left back: a narrow blade passed through the shoulder blade, fractured the left third and fourth ribs and damaged soft tissue inside the chest. The distribution of the injury, together with the absence of defensive wounds visible on the body, has been interpreted as evidence for a violent death from an attack from behind.

== Exhibition history ==
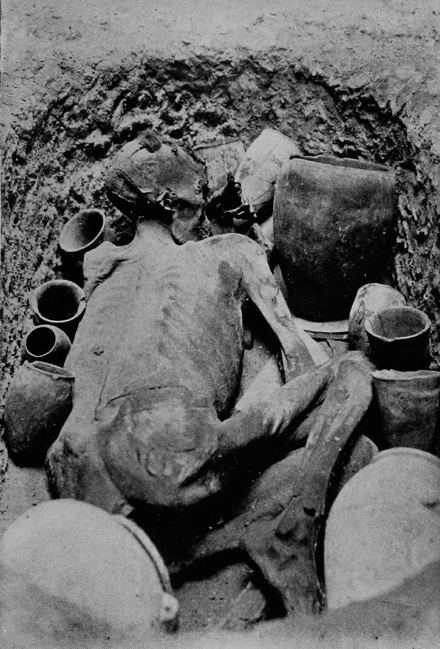
Plate from By Nile and Tigris vol.2, 1920 (facing p.360) showing how the body (EA 32751) was displayed in the British Museum at that time.

The mummies were acquired by the British Museum in 1900. One male adult body, museum number EA 32751, went on display in 1901 and remains on display in Room 64, case 15. In 1987, the body was temporarily taken off display for restoration and a female mummified body replaced it. She was nicknamed "Gingerella" even though her body has long brown hair.

The male body, EA 32751, is displayed in a reconstructed sand grave in the British Museum in Room 64, case 15. Though Budge wrote of "pots and flints" with the body, these artefacts were not acquired by the museum; a number of Egyptian grave goods taken from similar graves of the period are instead used in the display. The grave goods include black-topped clay pots typical of the predynastic period through to Naqada II, and plain and buff-coloured pots and bowls typical of slightly later periods. There are also slate palettes, hard stone vessels and flint knives, which would be associated with more elaborate burials of the historical period.

One man was wrapped in a skin, a second in a mat of palm fibre, and the third was rolled up in a reed mat. The woman was without covering, and the only pot in her grave contained what seemed to be a sort of dried porridge...
I unpacked the first man we had taken out of his grave at Gebelên one Saturday in March 1900, in the presence of Lord Crawford and the Principal Librarian, and when it was laid on a table it was as complete as when I first saw it at Gebelên. But when it was examined again on the following Monday morning it was discovered that the top joint of one of the forefingers was missing, and it has, to my knowledge never been found since. The body was exhibited at once in the First Egyptian Room, and for the first time the British public saw a neolithic Egyptian.

— Wallis Budge, By Nile and Tigris, 1920

Of the other five bodies, only the female adult, given museum number EA 32752, has been exhibited. In 1997–98, the body was part of a tour to Rome as part of the Palazzo Ruspoli, Ancient Faces exhibition. Again in 2001 the body went to Birmingham as part of the Gas Hall Egypt Revealed exhibition. In 2001, before going out on loan, the body had some restoration using Japanese kozo paper to secure a loose finger, reattach a rib and reattach some locks of hair. Strips of polyethylene were used to reduce the movement of the right arm.

== See also ==
- Predynastic Egyptian mummies
- List of unsolved murders (before 1900)
- Ötzi the Iceman, a rough contemporary.

== Sources ==
- Andrews, Carol (1984), Egyptian mummies, British Museum, Harvard University Press, ISBN 978-0-674-24152-7
- Budge, Ernest Alfred Thompson Wallis (1920), By Nile and Tigris: a narrative of journeys in Egypt and Mesopotamia on behalf of the British Museum between the years 1886 and 1913, John Murray: London, OCLC 558957855
- Dawson, Warren R; Gray, P.H.K. (1968), Catalogue of Egyptian antiquities in the British museum, vol. 1: Mummies and human remains, British Museum, ISBN 0-7141-0902-9, OCLC 462523497
- Rae, A (1996), "Dry human and animal remains—their treatment at the British Museum", The Man in the Ice, International mummy symposium; Wien: Springer-Verlag, pp. 33–38, ISBN 3-211-82659-9, ISSN 0947-3483
- Strudwick, Nigel (2006), Masterpieces of ancient Egypt, British Museum Press, ISBN 0-7141-1972-5
This article is about an item held in the British Museum. The object reference is EA 32751.
