= Pan-Grave culture =

Middle Nubian archaeological culture

The Pan-Grave culture is a Middle Bronze Age archaeological culture of Ancient Egypt, Nubia, and possibly the Eastern Desert from about 1850 BCE – 1600 BCE. They were once identified with the Medjay of the Egyptian textual tradition. Some may have worked as mercenaries during the Egyptian wars of the Second Intermediate Period, while others blended as a Nubian identity into Egyptian society along the Nile Valley. They were once connected with the Eastern Desert, but no evidence for them has been found in the Eastern Desert.

== Pan-Grave people ==
The Pan-Grave people first appear in the archaeological record during the late Middle Kingdom of Egypt and become more prominent during the Second Intermediate Period of Egypt, coinciding with the decentralization of Egyptian power. The archaeological tradition was first identified by Flinders Petrie at a cemetery location in Hu, south of Abydos. Many other burial sites have been found in the Lower Nubia region, with particularly large cemeteries being found at Mostagedda, north of Abydos, and Debeira and Ashkeit, near the Second Cataract.

The Pan-Grave Culture gets its name from the pan-shaped graves they were buried in. Typically speaking, the body is buried in a crouched position on its right side with handmade bowls, animal skulls, and Egyptian-style weapons.

== Medjay and the Pan-Grave culture ==
Scholars have linked the Medjay and the Pan-Grave culture for two main reasons. The first being that both the Medjay and the Pan-Grave fought as mercenaries in the Second Intermediate Period, evidenced by the existence of Egyptian-style weapons in Pan-Grave burials. The second reason being that the Pan-Grave were thought to have originated from the Eastern Desert, much like the Medjay. This claim is supported by the existence of items that are associated with the Eastern Desert being found in their burials.

There are, however, some inconsistencies with definitively linking the Medjay and the Pan-Grave Culture. For example, no archaeological evidence of the Pan-Grave Culture has been found in the Eastern Desert, where the Medjay originated from. Furthermore, the Medjay appeared in Egyptian texts such as the Autobiography of Weni and the Semna Dispatches, dating to the Old and Middle Kingdoms, respectively. On the contrary, the Pan-Grave Culture has only been dated to the Second Intermediate Period. One possible theory explaining this is that the Pan-Grave culture had been present in the Nile Valley for much longer, and the decline of Egyptian central authority allowed for the culture to penetrate the archaeological record.

Scholars such as Maria Gatto have also argued that the Pan-Grave were instead pastoral nomads that migrated to the Nile Valley during the Second Intermediate Period.

== Pan-Grave burials ==
Despite the name, not all Pan-Grave burial sites are pan-shaped. Pan-Grave burials came in many different forms; there are five main classifications: sand graves, oval graves, rectangular graves, and tumuli graves. Scholars such as Aaron de Souza believe that the types of burials used changed as the Pan-Grave culture evolved.

=== Sand graves ===
Sand graves are the pan-shaped graves that give the Pan-Grave culture its name. The graves are dug into the soft sand and are typically round and shallow. Pottery, animal hides, and baskets can be found in these types of graves. These are the newest types of Pan-Grave burials.

=== Circular graves ===
Circular graves are the oldest and most common type of Pan-Grave burial. They were bowl-shaped, and the walls of the grave were more round in shape. They were often built on a more solid foundation. The body was positioned with their knees to their chest, with burial artifacts placed around it in the center of the grave.

=== Oval graves ===
Oval graves were egg-shaped. Some records show that shelves were built into the walls of the grave. This is around the intermediate time for the Pan-Grave people.

=== Rectangular graves ===
Rectangular graves are the rarest type of Pan-Grave burial and date back to the late Seventeenth and early Eighteenth dynasties of Egypt. They were usually one or two meters in length and one meter deep. The graves had sharp corners and often had a mud-brick wall. Typically, the body was laid straight, and the head was aligned with the spine. These types of graves also featured coffins. Rectangular graves are evidence of the influence Egyptian culture had on the Pan-Grave people.

=== Tumuli ===
Tumuli are graves that have stones, sand, and other things stacked on top of them in a mound shape. Pan-Grave tumuli were typically covered with sand.

== Artifacts of the Pan-Grave culture ==
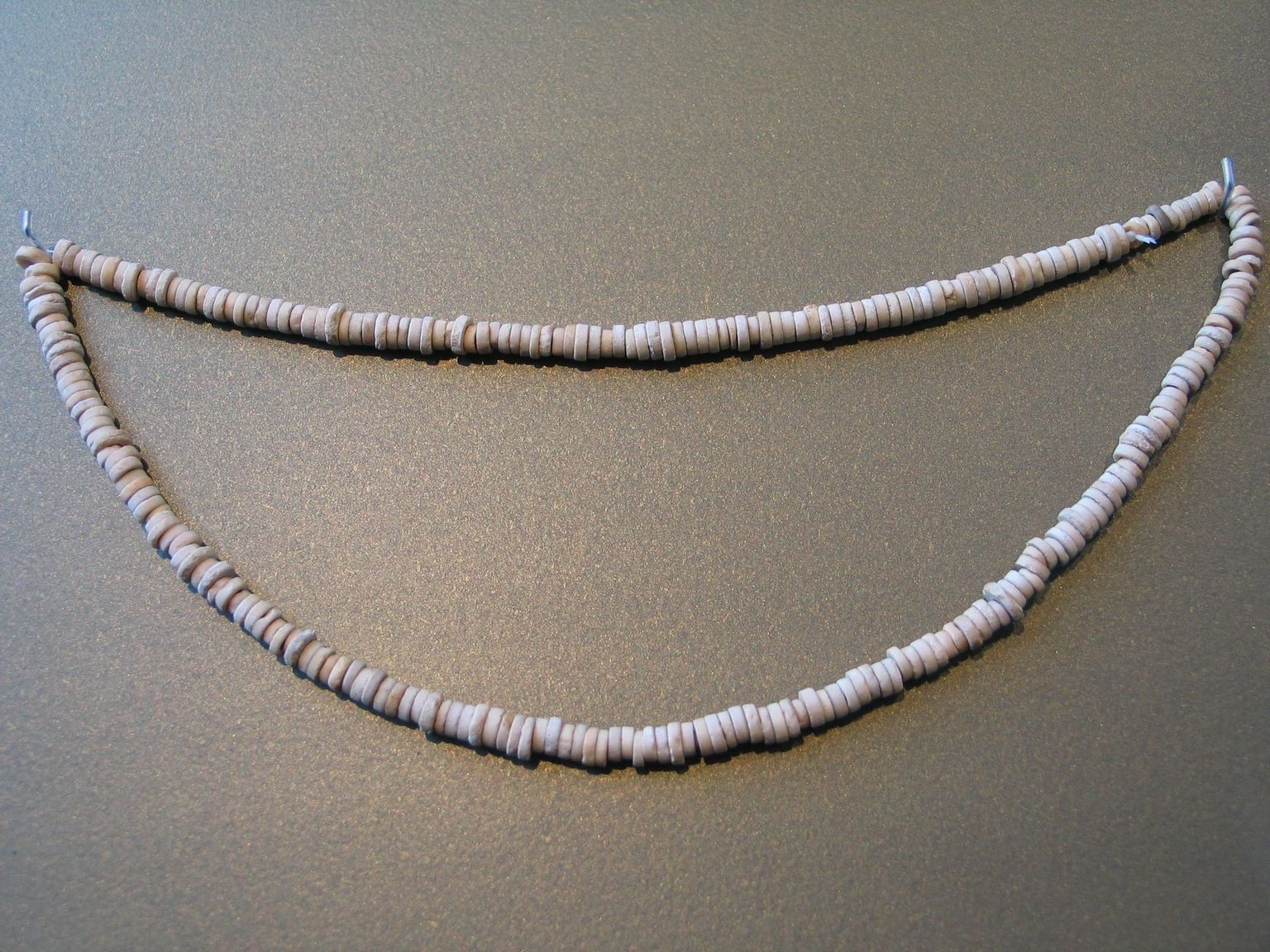
A Pan-Grave necklace

The major connection between the Pan-Grave gravesites is the commonality of artifacts. Common grave artifacts include axes, armbands, bovine skulls, and, most importantly, pottery. A majority of the pottery found in Pan-Grave burials was not made by them. They were likely the result of trade with other cultures. The materials used were from all over the world. There were intricate hand-made pots that were made by the Pan-Grave people. The bovine skulls, from deer or other antlered animals, were painted with scenes of battle. For ceremonial and practical reasons, most of the burials included axes and arm bands. This was not a rite for just the men either; women and young children, who were no older than a few weeks or years old, were buried with wood axes as well.

== Mostagedda Grave 3252 ==
The only textual evidence that has been definitively associated with the Pan-Grave culture was found in a grave at a large cemetery in Mostagedda. The text consists of six Egyptian hieroglyphs painted on an ox skull, and the grave itself only consisted of buried goat and cow remains.

There is discussion over the interpretation of the text; scholars believe that the text is most likely a personal name or a title. It has commonly been read as Ḳskꜣnt, meaning ‘master of the horn’. However, scholars such as Julien Cooper have suggested that the text is rather etymologically descended from an ancient Eastern African language, and thus the common interpretation is inaccurate.

The Egyptian art style and script may allude to a strong connection between the Pan-Grave Culture and Egypt. The evidence of other typically Egyptian artwork, burial customs, and pottery in other Pan-Grave burials suggests a high level of syncretism in Pan-Grave communities.
