= Mostagedda =

Archaeological site in Egypt

- Location in Egypt
- Interactive map of Mostagedda
- 27°4′59.99″N 31°22′59.99″E
- Type: Necropolis
- Cultures: Pan-Grave culture Badarian culture Ancient Egypt
- Location: Asyut Governorate, Egypt
- Region: Upper Egypt

Site notes
- Archaeologists: Guy Brunton; Winifred Brunton

Mostagedda is an archaeological site in Middle Egypt, located along the eastern edge of the Nile valley, between the cultivated land and the desert cliffs in the modern town of El-Badari. The site contains burial grounds and archeological remains from several periods of ancient Egypt, including the Badarian, Predynastic and Pan-Grave periods. Guy Brunton excavated the area between 1927 and 1929 and found graves with pottery, stone tools, jewelry and other burial objects. His findings were published in 1937.

Mostagedda played an important role on the discovery of the Tasian culture. Brunton believed that the Tasian culture was an older culture than the Badarian, he said because of the differences in pottery, burial features, stone palletes, and human remains. Later on archaeologist Marteen Horn argued this judgement in 2017. By comparing burial objects and practices, Horn found that Tasian and Badarian shared many characteristics and argued that the two groups could belong to a single tradition in the region.

The site also contains cemetery 3100/3200 which includes 107 recorded Pan-Grave burials. Archeologist Aaron De Souza identified it as the largest known concentration of Pan-Graves in Egypt. His 2019 study looked at the cemeteries grave construction, pottery and burial objects and figured that most of its activity was in the Seventeenth Dynasty, during the Second Intermediate Period.

== Location and archaeological setting ==
Mostagedda is located on the Eastern side of the Nile Valley in Middle Egypt. It lies between the farmland to the west and the limestone cliffs of the Eastern desert to the East. The archeological area goes along the narrow strip of desert with Khawaled to the North and Deir Tasa to the South. In the 1937 excavation report Brunson referred to the spot as Nazlet el Mostagedda.

The landscape has several wadis that extend west from the eastern desert cliffs towards the Nile Valley. Brunton identified a Wadi near Khawaled two near Mostagedda and another south towards the cliff road and one in the bay near Deir Tasa. These valleys divide the low desert into separate spurs where remains were discovered. South of the excavation camp Brunton described a large headland approximately half a mile wide with a rock shelf about 120 feet (37 meters) above the lower ground. This shelf had been used as a route during times when the Nile would flood.

Brunton divided the area into numbered excavation sections recording all found burial grounds and traces of prehistoric settlements across the desert. His maps show cemeteries 300 and 400, 1200, 2800 and 2200/3500. These areas had Tasian and Badarian graves, predynastic burials, and remains from later periods of Egyptian history. Old Kingdom rock cut tombs were also found near the base of the limestone cliffs on the East.

To the south near Deir Tasa, cemetery 3100/3200 had a major concentration of Pan-Grave burials. Aaron De Souza's 2019 study showed 107 burials at this cemetery. Only 19 of the graves were remained undisturbed. The cemetery had circular, oval, and rectangular graves and was dated mainly to the Second Intermediate Period probably the Seventeenth Dynasty.

== Excavation History ==
=== Background and organization ===
The Excavations at Mostagedda were carried out by Guy Brunton and his wife, Winifred Brunton from 1927 to 1929. The couple paid for the new expedition and the British Museum gave official sponsorship and facilities for unpacking and exhibiting the finding giving the museum first choice on any item brought to England.

=== First Excavation ===
The first excavation began on November 11th, 1927, and ended on April 8th, 1928. The team established its camp on a desert spur near Mostagedda overlooking a palm garden with limestone cliffs behind it. The excavation included asiistant Oliver H. Myers and C.H. Bach who volunteered to help. Ali Suefi was the foreman and supervised about 30 workers. During part of January 1928 Brunton had traveled elsewhere to do work and left Bach on charge of the site while he was gone.

=== Second excavation ===
The second excavation began on December 22nd, 1928, and ended on April 10th, 1929. L.P. Kirwan joined the expedition as an assistant and the team continued with approximately the same number of workers as the previous expedition. The discoveries from this excavation were on display at the British museum from July 1st to 31st 1930. Winifred Brunton was responsible for much of the expedition's illustration. She spent her days drawing pottery vessels, beads, and other objects found during the excavation. According to Guy Brunton this helped the records to remain up to date and provided many of the illustrations later included in the excavation report.

=== Excavation areas and recording methods ===
Brunton divided the landscape into numbered areas to organize the excavations. These areas included 2900/3000 that had Tasian, Old Kingdom and later graves. Also, Area 3100/3200 that had prehistoric settlement remains, Badarian graves and a Pan-Grave cemetery. In Area 2200/3500 the team looked into a large Badarian cemetery during both excavations. Brunton reported that this cemetery had not been disturbed by modern digging before the exploration. Not every area was completely excavated. Area 4000 South of Deir Tasa had already been disturbed. After one day of research the team decided that further excavation would not be productive. Area 4100 immediately North of Deir Tasa had traces of a Predynastic settlement, but archaeologists only looked at a sample of the area because the deposits were shallow. The Excavation records include measurements of the grave's dimensions, body positions, burial orientations, and objects found inside graves. Measurements were recorded in centimeters, and grave orientations were estimated using a compass. Brunton also used a system to describe the condition of burials, a way to show the condition between undisturbed, partially disturbed, and heavily disturbed. Pottery and other objects were recorded with measurements and illustrations.

== Tasian and Badarian burials ==
The excavations at Mostegadda showed prehistoric graves that Guy Brunton described as belonging to the Tasian and Badarian cultures. These burials were discovered across several excavation areas, including areas 400,800,1200, and 2800. Brunton uses differences in pottery, stone tools, palettes, and burial objects to tell the Tasian from Badarian, however graves were similar.

=== Tasian burials ===
Many of the Tasian burials contained bodies with arms and feet bent towards the body. Reed matting Animal skins and leather were frequently used to cover the deceased. Pottery vessels were often put near the head, arms, knees or feet. some also contained personal items.

Grave 408 had a child approximately 3 years old inside a rectangular container made from sticks and twigs. The container measured approximately 40 by 70 by 20 centimeters and was covered with matting. The child had been wrapped in animal skins with cloth and leather. A layer of chaff beneath the skull appeared to have served as a pillow. An ivory bracelet was found on the left wrist while a string of shells and a bird bone bead was placed between the knees and elbows. Two pottery vessels stood in front of the face outside of the container with the smaller vessel inverted over the rim of the larger one. Grave 426 had another child buried inside a container made from sticks measuring approximately 75 by 95 centimeters. The burial was undisturbed when excavated. Grave 464 had an elderly woman whose body was on a mat that was approximately 50 centimeters up the side of the grave. Two layers of animal skins were under the body while seven or eight additional layers covered it. The woman's head rested on folded leather, and a shell necklace was found on her neck. A black pottery vessel stood near her feet, while a brown pot containing organic material had been place outside the cover near her face. Grave 466 had an adult male covered with dark haired animal skins. Wooden sticks along the sides od the burial suggested the presence of a container measuring about 79 by 110 by 25 centimeters. A pottery vessel containing organic material was placed near the head and tracings of matting nearby may have formed a covering for the vessel.

=== Burials in area 2800 ===
Area 2800 contained several Tasian Burials with evidence of leather coverings, matting, pottery, and personal jewelry. Grave 2829 had a child about five years old wrapped in multiple layers of leather with reed matting above the body. The child's right hand rested near the knees. An ivory bangle and a bead made from bird bone shaft were found, while two pottery vessels stood near the head with traces of matting found nearby. This burial was positioned 50 centimeters above burial 2853. Grave 2853 had the remains of a possible female, with reed matting traces of cloth and several layers of leather around the feet and between the elbows and knees. An alabaster palette was placed in front of the fore arms with a small piece of ostrich eggshell nearby.

=== Grave 2840 ===
Grave 2840 had an adult woman and a small child positioned between her arms and knees. The matting had largely decayed but Brunton identified plant material beneath the woman's head. Near her skull was an alabaster palette stained green on the side and red on the other, a brown jasper pebble, a small ivory spoon, and a triangular object that was described as a possible bead. The child was accompanied by an ivory bangle with a knob and a string of 18 Nerita shells. A pottery vessel stood near the woman's knees, while a pointed ivory rod was found from the upper filling of the grave. Brunton illustrated several of these objects in plates XIII and XXII.

=== Badarian burials ===
Badarian graves were found in many of the same grave sites as the Tasian burials. Cemetery 1200 was on a desert spur that had many of Badarian graves. Unfortunately, ancient looting and later burials had disturbed much of the cemetery. Area 2200/3500 also contained a large Badarian cemetery researched during both excavations. Brunton recorded pottery vessels, stone tools, personal jewelry, animal skins and matting in Badarian burials. Some objects closely resemble those of Tasian. For example Grave 2817 was included in the Badarian register but Brunton later said that it was Tasian. Grave 2206 Had a damaged partly polished limestone tool that he believed might belong to an earlier Tasian occupation. But Brunton stated Tasian burial was unlikely.

=== Tasian Badarian classification ===
Brunton had found that incised pots, polished stone axes, and limestone palettes as objects that could distinguish Tasian remains from Badarian. He found eighteen polished stone axes from the excavations. 13 of the axes were made of polished limestone while 6 were made from darker igneous stone. Brunton suggested that the limestone tools may have been produced locally while the igneous stones ones could have reached the area through exchange.

In 2017 archaeologist Maarten Horn reexamined the difference between Tasian and Badarian burials by comparing beads, shells, pendants, bangles, and other forms of burial items. He found similarities in the items, construction, and placement of jewelry. Horn discussed grave 2840 as an example of the difficulties surrounding the original classifications. Although the ornaments had been associated with the Tasian culture, similar objects were also present in Badarian graves. Horn argued that the evidence did not clearly support treating the two groups as separate cultures and proposed that they could be considered part of the same broader Badarian unit.

== Predynastic burials ==
The excavations at Mostagedda found graves belonging to the Predynastic period, including burials associated with the Naqada culture. Guy Brunton recorded these graves in several excavation areas. Areas included 200,400,1200,1600,1700,1800, and 2200. Many had been disturbed by looting, leaving incomplete skeletons and scattered burial objects. The surviving evidence included pottery vessels, wooden burial structures, stone palletes, flint tools, beads, and jewelry.

=== Grave construction and burial practices ===
Some predynastic graves contained wooden structures that supported coverings or surrounded the deceased. Grave 227 contained the remains of a wooden frame constructed from upright corner posts and horizontal crossbars. The posts measures approximately 5 centimeters in diameter. Wickerwork been attached to the frame apparently forming a lining around the body and possibly a roof for the burial. Grave 237 was an example of a more elaborate burial structure. The grave measure 117by 56 centimeters and had been lined with mud plaster and wooden planks. rectangular wooden uprights measured around 7.5 by 6 centimeters. while the attached planks were about 4 centimeters thick and 13.5 centimeters wide. surviving wooden sections reached a height of 17 centimeters although they were believed to have been taller. There was matting on the floor and a roof as well.

=== Burial objects and personal objects ===
Pottery vessels were frequently placed near the deceased, sometimes alongside stone tools and personal belongings. Grave 216 had several pottery vessels with traces of organic materials like charcoal and possible remains of basket t lids. A slate pallette was also found. Grave 320 contained ivory combs positioned near the hands in front of the deceased face rather than on head. Brunton also recorded pottery and beads from the burial. Grave 400 contained the remains of a very young chile with a pottery vessel representing an hourglass shape. In Grave 1657 Malachite was ground in the hands of the deceased. Grave 1667 contained malachite associated with cloth near the face, along with a spatha shell filled with malachite near the hands. These discoveries provide evidence of the use of mineral pigments and shells in Predynastic burials.

=== Wooden coffins and body coverings ===
Grace 1677 had a wooden coffin made from boards about 2 centimeters thick. The coffin measured 140 by 62centimeters and stood more than 24 centimeters high. Pottery vessels were found inside the coffin. Grave 1609 had a body covered with multiple layers of cloth. the head was missing but traces of a black beard remained. three pottery vessels were arranged between the knees and hands with the forelegs of an animal possibly a gazelle. A flint flake was also found. Grave 1826 had an undisturbed female burial with matting placed above and below the body. The deceased had short brown wavy hair, and the skin was relatively well preserved. Two pottery vessels were placed near the head and hands. Jewelry at the wrist included 3 wooden beads, five calcite rings, and seven additional rings made with thin material surrounding a paste core.

== Pan-Grave Cemetery ==
=== Cemetery 3100/3200 ===
Cemetery 3100/3200 at Mostagedda is located on the eastern bank of the Nile, near Deir Tasa. It contains the largest known concentration of Pan-Grave burial contexts in Egypt. Archaeologist Aaron M. de Souza recorded 107 burial contexts at the cemetery, although only 19 remained relatively undisturbed. The cemetery had been heavily looted before excavation, leaving many graves with incomplete remains and disturbed burial objects. De Souza dated most of the cemetery's activity to the Second Intermediate Period, probably during the Seventeenth Dynasty.

=== Grave construction ===
Four main grave shapes were recorded at Cemetery 3100/3200 24 circular graves, 45 oval graves, two circular or oval graves with a shelf built into the side, and 32 rectangular graves. Some circular graves were shallow, while many rectangular graves were considerably deeper. De Souza suggested that the large number of deep rectangular graves reflected Egyptian influence on burial practices at Mostagedda. No evidence of structures built above the graves was recorded. Guy Brunton originally found 24 graves containing wooden coffins, but De Souza later argued that only five could be strongly associated with Pan-Grave tradition based on burial objects. The remaining examples appeared more closely connected to Egyptian burial practices. Grave 3143 had a coffin painted white on the inside and fragments that Brunton identified as possibly belonging to a mask. A Pan-Grave black topped pot was also found inside the grave but the location was unknown due to the grave being disturbed.

=== Pottery and burial objects ===
The pottery recovered from Cemetery 3100/3200 included both Egyptian and Pan-Grave styles. Egyptian pottery included biconical jars made from marl clay, slender drop-shaped beakers, and bowls with sharply angled sides and incised decoration. Brunton classified the biconical jars under types 52, 54, 55, 57, and 59, the beakers under type 22, and several decorated bowls under types 5, 6, 8, and 9. These pottery forms helped de Souza identify the cemetery's main period of use. Pan-Grave pottery at Mostagedda was generally finer and had thinner walls than pottery found at several other Pan-Grave sites. Some vessels had exceptionally smooth, glossy, burnished surfaces. Red polished pottery also showed differences in firing techniques while some vessels had carefully applied black tops that were added before firing. These black topped vessels appeared in different grave shaped but were especially common in oval and rectangle graves. De Souza thought this an indication that the technique developed during a later phase of the pan-Grave tradition.

=== Bronze axes and dating evidence ===
Ten bronze axes were recorded among the cemetery's burial objects. One of the best-preserved examples came from Grave 3135 and remained attached to its wooden handle. The axe carried the royal name Nebmaatre inside a cartouche, an oval-shaped frame used for Egyptian royal names. Although the exact dates of this ruler remain argued, de Souza considered a Seventeenth Dynasty date the most likely. Another important discovery came from Grave 3252, which contained a painted bucranium, or decorated cattle skull. The decoration included a soldier who appeared to be carrying an axe similar to those found in the cemetery. De Souza considered the Egyptian style of the painted figure additional evidence of cultural interaction between Pan-Grave communities and Egyptian society.

=== Chronology and cultural connections ===
De Souza concluded that Cemetery 3100/3200 was most likely used mainly during the Seventeenth Dynasty, although a small amount of evidence suggested earlier activity. His interpretation was based on pottery forms, burial construction, bronze axes, and Egyptian influences visible in the grave goods. He also noted that the Egyptian pottery at Mostagedda differed from that found at nearby Rifeh, suggesting that the communities may have interacted with different Egyptian groups.

=== Isolated Pan-Grave finds ===
Pan-Grave objects were also found in at least three graves outside Cemetery 3100/3200, although their cultural identification was uncertain. Grave 423 contained fragments of a red pottery bowl with incised decoration. Grave 1810A was an earlier tomb reused during a later period and contained six pottery vessels in its shaft filling, including five Egyptian vessels and a large handmade Nubian cooking pot with irregular combed markings on its exterior. No human remains were recorded in the tomb, making it hard to identify as a Pan-Grave burial. Grave 1895 was also constructed within the shaft of an earlier tomb. A black topped pottery bowl placed near the deceased's head was the main object connecting the burial to Nubian traditions. De Souza then treated its Pan-grave identification as uncertain.

== Burials from later periods ==
Mostagedda continued to be used as a burial ground after the Predynastic period. Guy Brunton's excavations uncovered graves dating to the New Kingdom, Late Period, Ptolemaic, Roman, and Coptic periods. These later burials were distributed across several excavation areas, often overlapping earlier cemeteries. Their contents included wooden coffins, pottery, scarabs, jewelry, textiles, and other burial objects.

=== New Kingdom burials ===
Brunton reported relatively few New Kingdom burials at Mostagedda. A small group of graves was discovered in Area 2600, south of the large headland, while additional graves were scattered through excavation areas farther north. The main New Kingdom burial ground in the region appeared to be near Khawaled, in Area 5300, where the tomb of an Egyptian official named Suti was located. Grave 128 had a woman lying on her back with her face turned southwest. Her hair was arranged in plaits, and the bones of an infant laid across her chest. A pot was placed in front of her face while 2 rounded beads and two scarabs were found near her hands. Brunton believed the grave to be Eighteenth Dynasty based on the pottery even though he believed the scarabs might be somewhat earlier. Another burial grave 1712 had a woman with an infant beside her. A small container used for eye cosmetics rested on the woman's chest. Grave 1711 had been partly damaged by Roman burial but still contained pottery, eight scarabs, a plaque, and six scaraboids. most of these objects were around her wrists and waist.

=== Tomb of Suti ===
One of the most important New Kingdom Monuments found near Mostagedda was the tomb of Suti, an Egyptian official associated with the reign of Seti I. The tomb was originally discovered in October 1899 when another grave was being dug. It was excavated for the Egyptian government by Mohammed Effendi Shaban. Brunton later got permission to reopen the tomb and examine its surviving architecture. The tomb contained decorated doorways showing Egyptian religious figures including Osiris, Horus, Anubis, and Isis. One scene showed Suti and his wife representing offerings to Osiris. Other decorations had solar boats and religious inscriptions. Brunton noticed some of the inscriptions on the sarcophagus had been poorly carved or carved incorrectly. The burial chamber contained a limestone lined trench covered by an inverted black granite sarcophagus. The sarcophagus had been re used with its inscriptions and decorations added after it was placed upside down. Objects recovered during Brunton's research included pottery, fragments of alabaster, blue beads, and pieces of blue glass decorated with flowers. Suti had many titles, royal scribe, overseer of the treasury, and military general.

=== Late Period and Ptolemaic burials ===
Graves dating back to the late and Ptolemaic periods were discovered in many excavation areas, with larger areas near Deir Tasa and Khawaled. Cemetery 3900 south of the large headland, had burials that Brunton dated to the Ptolemaic or early Roman period. Grave 541 contained an anthropoid coffin holding a mummy decorated with leaves. grave 588 was a brick lined burial with a flat roof that had a woman about eighteen years old. She had short brown hair and wore linen clothing with red triangular patterns. Two necklaces were on her neck with cowrie shells, carnelian, amethyst, and glass beads. The burial also had two finger rings one made form bronze. Grave 1506 was a large brick tomb with a vaulted roof and two chambers measuring about 205 by 75 centimeters and 320 by 150 centimeters. The chambers were approximately 155 and 200 centimeters high. At least seven people were buried in anthropoid coffins, with their heads positioned North. The tomb also had pottery fragments of large double handled jars. Brunton studied several brick sizes in the chambers.

=== Animal burials ===
Brunton also recorded a group of sheep burials in cemetery 100. Assistant Archaeologist Oliver H. Myers documented seven sheep and three lambs buried in separate graves. Grave 111 had a Ram lying in a crouched position facing North. And grave 112 had a ram with a young lamb positioned between its front legs and chin. The sheep grave was aligned at bout 150 degrees and measured between 77 and 90 centimeters deep, 50 and 70 centimeters wide and 90 and 127 centimeters long. Some graves were covered with limestone slabs. no evidence of mummification found even though arts of animal survived. Brunton thought that these burials probably belonged to the Ptolemaic period, but he acknowledged that their exact date was uncertain. He interpreted the graves as possible evidence that the animals had religious significance.

=== Roman and Coptic burials ===
Roman period burials and Mostagedda had jewelry, pottery, and textiles. grave 574 contained a child buried with two bronze earrings and a necklace of glass beads in red, blue yellow and black. Grave 576 had another child wearing a necklace made from shells, glass eye beads, ivory, and carnelian. Grave 577 contained a child accompanied by a necklace of yellow glass barrel shaped beads. grave 811 had a woman wearing a blue and red scarf approximately 8 centimeters wide as well with a leather headband decorated with silver and colored glass beads. An iron bangle was found on her right wrist. Brunton described this burial as Coptic. Several Coptic burials had clothing decorated with embroidery. Grave 1402 had a woman wrapped in blue cloth with white decoration and grave 1407 had a child wearing clothes with purple embroidery and beads around the neck. Grave 1409 had a woman with a dress decorated in blue embroidery, a bronze neck ring, and several bronze finger rings.

=== Early Arab burials ===
The excavations found burials that Brunton classified as Arab burials. Grave 1414 had a woman placed with her head toward the west inside a brick sealed burial. She wore bronze earrings, a necklace of red glass beads with designs, and a bronze bangle. A knitted wool bag was also found near her right shoulder. The bricks used in the grave measured about 25 by 12 by 8 centimeters. Grave 1415 located next to Grave 1414 had a man with a pottery jug near his head. Grave 1423 had a woman buried with a bronze chain, a lead cross, part of a bone hairpin, and several beads. These burials show that archaeological landscape around Mostagedda continued to be used long after the earlier Egyptian cemeteries had been established.

== Archaeological significance and later research ==
=== Identification of the Tasian Culture ===
Mostagedda played an important role in identifying the Tasian culture. In 1937, Guy Brunton separated Tasian burials from Badarian burials using pottery, polished stone axes, and stone palettes. He identified 18 excavated stone axes, including 13 made from limestone and 5 from darker igneous stone. Brunton believed these discoveries represented a prehistoric tradition earlier than Badarian.

=== Reassessment of the Tasian Badarian Distinction ===
In 2017, Archaeologist Maarten Horn questioned Brunton's theory of comparing the burial objects from both groups. Horn found that Tasian and Badarian graves shared similar beads, shells, pendants, and ivory bangles. These objects also showed similarities in their materials, manufacturing methods, sizes and positions around the dead. Ivory bangles provided evidence of these similarities. Tasian grave 408 had a 3 year old child with a bangle measuring 3.75 centimeters in inner diameter. Badarian grave 2211 had another 3 year old child with 5 bangles measuring between 4.4 and 5.0 centimeters. Horn suggests that differences in bangle size and shapes could reflect the age of deceased rather than separate cultures. horn also examined feathers used in burials. Grave 443 had an adult with a feather above the head while Grave 448a had an infant with a feather across the mouth. He found similar burial practices among Tasian and Badarian graves suggesting both groups followed some shared traditions. Grave 2840 was important because it had an adult woman and a small child buried with an ivory bangle, 18 shells, a travertine palette and a pottery bowl. Brunton considered some of these objects Tasian, but Horn found comparable materials in Badarian graves. Horn proposed that the Tasian and Badarian remains in the region could belong to a broader Badarian unit rather the clearly two separate cultures.

=== Importance of the Pan-Grave cemetery ===
Mostagedda provides evidence of Pan-Grave burial practices during the Second Intermediate Period. In 2019 Aaron De Souza looked at cemetery 3100/3200, which had 107 rocorded burial contexts. The recorded grave shapes included 24 circular, 45 oval, 32 rectangular graves, and 2 graves featuring side shelfs. De Souza identified ten bronze axes from the cemetery. An axe from grave 3135 remained attached to its wooden handle and carried the royal name Nebmaatre. grave 3252 contained a painted cattle skull showing a soldier carrying an axe. Together with Egyptian pottery found in the cemetery these discoveries helped De Souza date most of its use to the seventeenth dynasty and examine interactions between Egyptian and Pan-Grave communities.

=== Continuing Archaeological importance ===
Brunton's excavation records included grave measurements body positions, pottery classifications, burial objects, and cemetery maps. These records allowed Horn to reassess the Tasian-Badarian difference and De Souza to look at Pan-Grave burial practices decades after the original excavations. Their research shows how Mostagedda continues to contribute to the study of prehistoric Egypt and cultural interaction in the Nile valley.

== Gallery ==
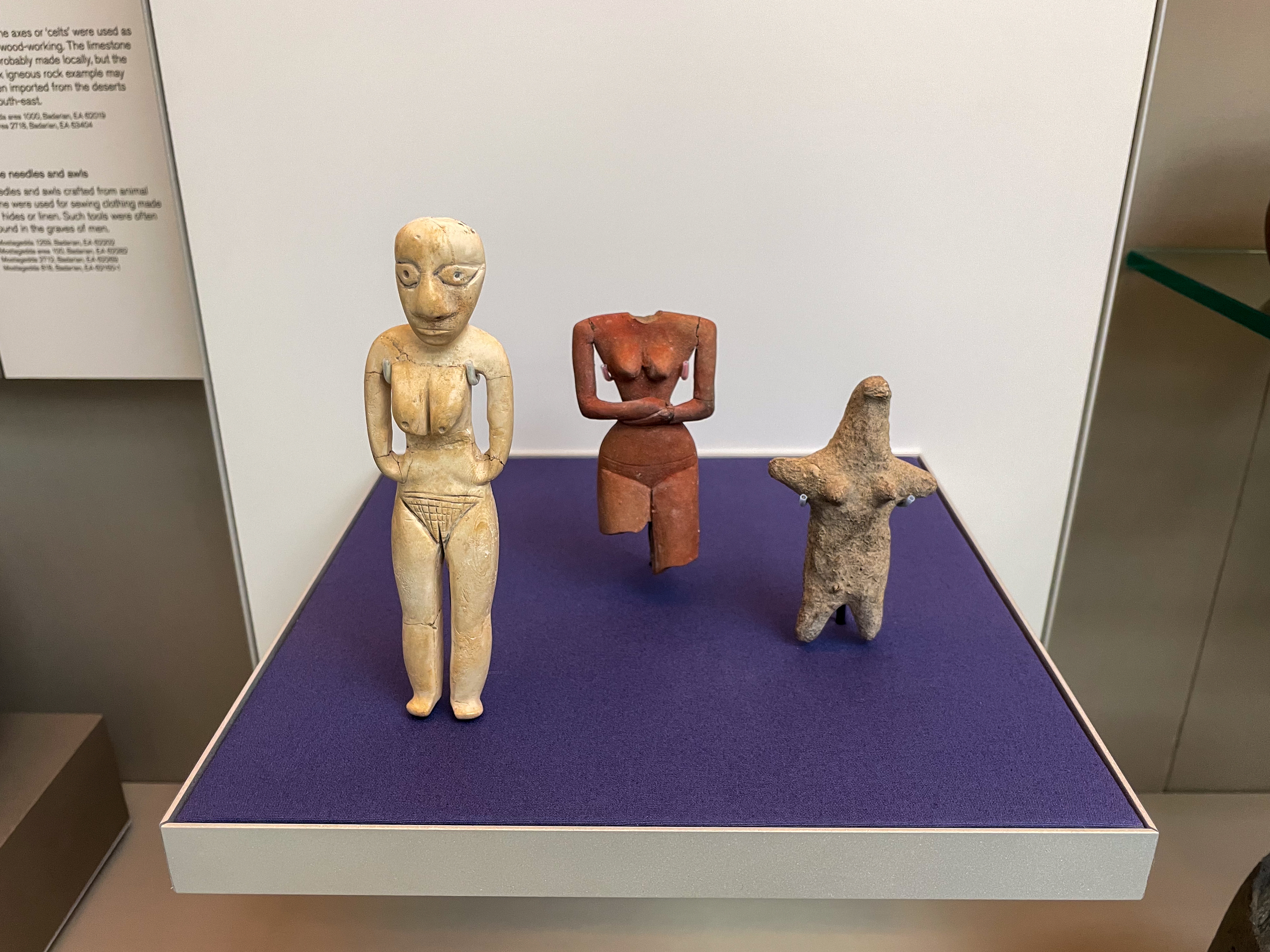
Badarian culture female figures

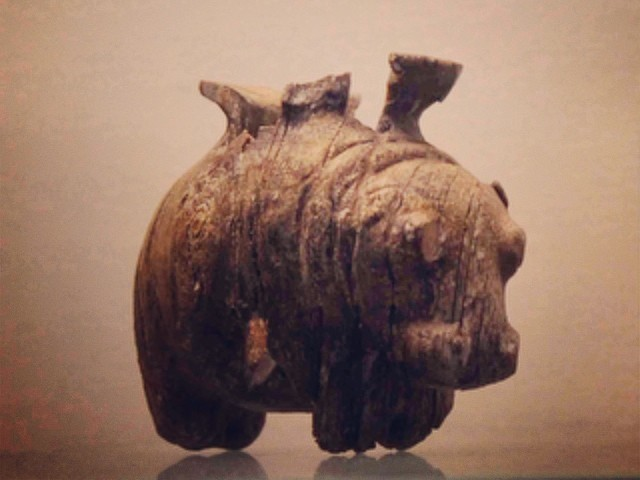
Vase in the shape of a hippopotamus

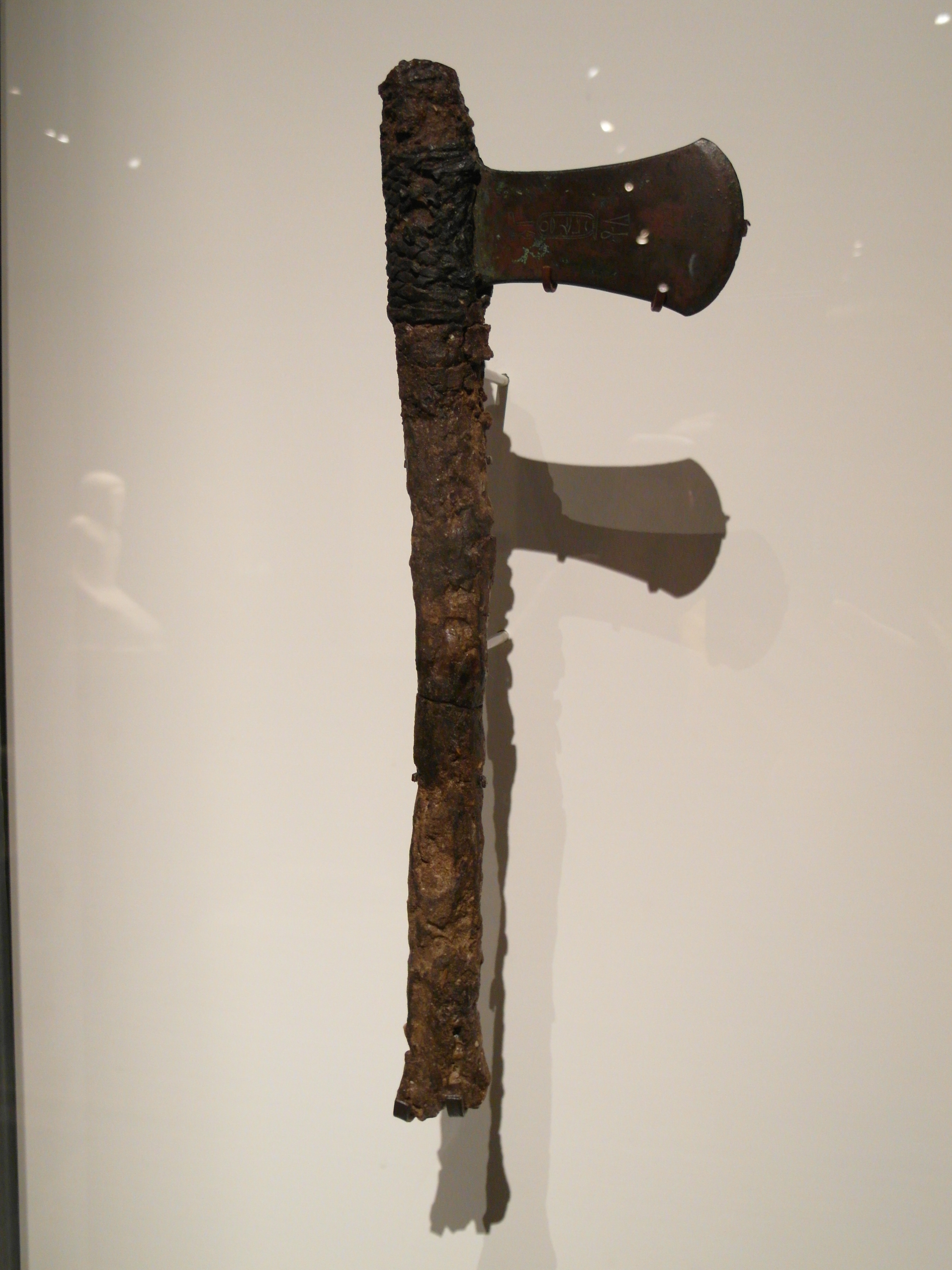
Axe with an inscription of Nebmaatre

== See also ==
- Media related to Mostagedda at Wikimedia Commons

== Bibliography ==
- Brunton, Guy. (1937). ''Mostagedda and the Tasian Culture''. British Museum Expedition to Middle Egypt, First and Second Years, 1928–1929. London: Bernard Quaritch.
- Horn, Maarten. (2017). “Re-appraising the Tasian-Badarian Divide in the Qau-Matmar Region: A Critical Review of Cultural Proxies and a Comparative Analysis of Burial Dress.” In ''Egypt at Its Origins 5'', edited by Béatrix Midant-Reynes and Yann Tristant. Orientalia Lovaniensia Analecta 260. Leuven: Peeters, pp. 335–377.
- de Souza, Aaron M. (2019). ''New Horizons: The Pan-Grave Ceramic Tradition in Context''. Middle Kingdom Studies 9. London: Golden House Publications.
