= Winifred Brunton =

English painter

Winifred Mabel Brunton née Newberry
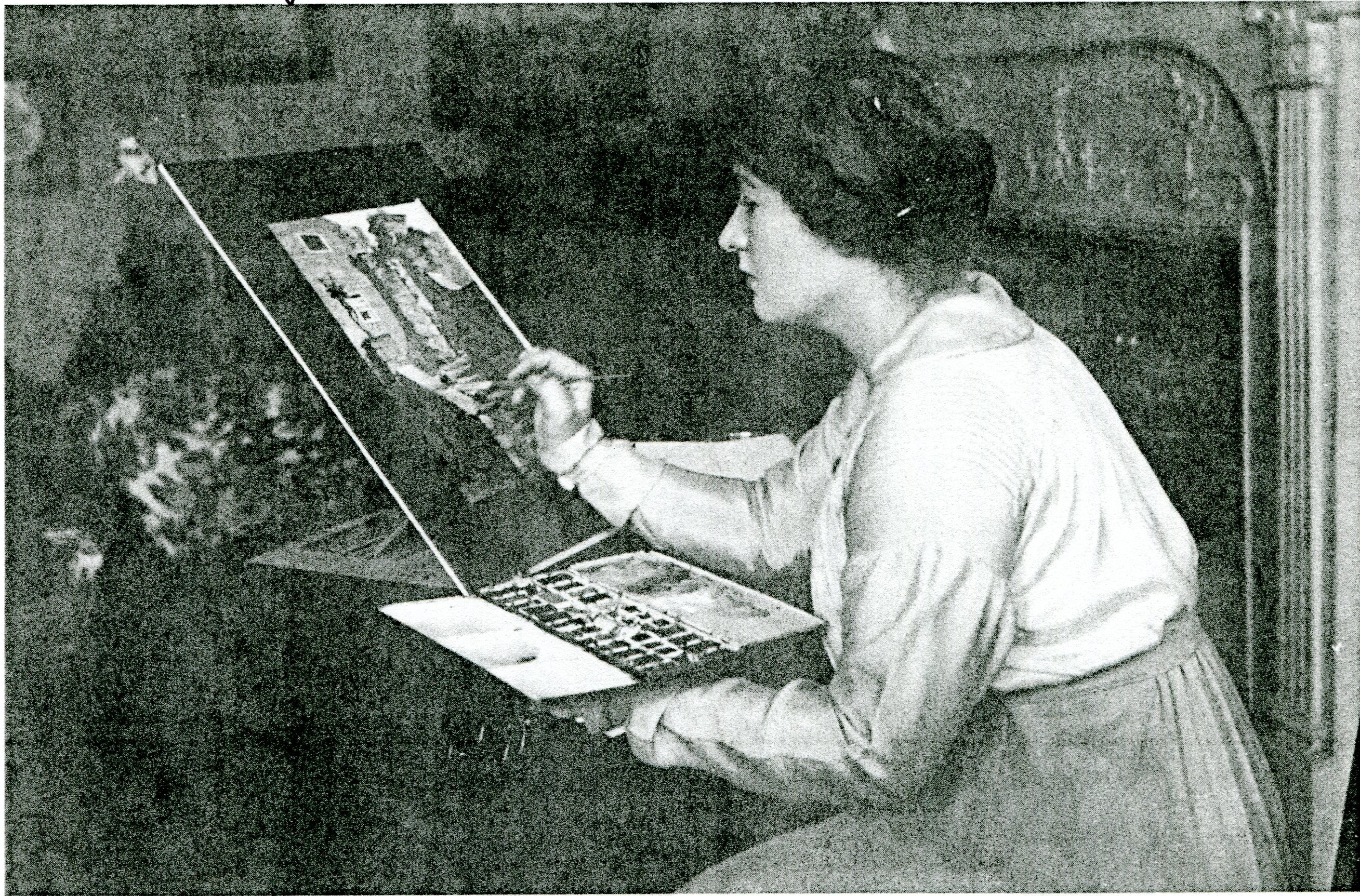
- Winifred Mabel Brunton née Newberry in her studio
- Born: 6 May 1880; Orange Free State
- Died: 29 January 1959 (aged 78); Clocolan, Orange Free State, South Africa
- Education: University College London (UCL)
- Known for: Painting, Egyptology
- Movement: Post-Impressionism
- Spouse: Guy Brunton (m. 1906)

Winifred Mabel Brunton née Newberry (6 May 1880 – 29 January 1959) was a South African painter, illustrator and Egyptologist.

== Life ==
Winifred Newberry was born in 1880 in the Orange Free State South Africa. Her father, Charles Newberry, a millionaire who made his money in Kimberly, was the builder of Prynnsberg Estate. Her mother Elizabeth was the daughter of a missionary to Moshoeshoe I and was herself intensely artistic. Winifred was presented at court in 1898 in London when she presumably met Guy Brunton, an Egyptologist who later became her husband.

They built the house in Berea, in Johannesburg, in 1906, the same year they were married. She became best known for her portraits of Egyptian pharaohs, published as Kings and Queens of Ancient Egypt (1926) and Great Ones of Ancient Egypt (1929). She married Egyptologist Guy Brunton on 28 April 1906 and together they studied at University College London, during which time she painted a portrait of Flinders Petrie in 1912, which is now in the collection of UCL Art Collection. At UCL they trained with Margaret Murray, before travelling to Lahun in Egypt to join Flinders Petrie for fieldwork in 1912–14. Working with her husband on the archaeological digs, she studied the evidence of the various painting, sculptures and even the mummies to develop her final portraits. Guy and Winifred both continued to contribute to excavations organised by Flinders Petrie's British School of Archaeology in Egypt in the 1920s at sites like Badari, with Winifred drawing many of the objects discovered.

Brunton died, aged 78, in Clocolan, Free State, South Africa.

== Popular culture ==
Her portraits have been hugely influential and defined the faces of the Pharaohs and the Queens in Popular culture and have been adopted in many films and documentaries.

== Publications ==
1926. Kings and Queens of Ancient Egypt. Portraits by Winifred Brunton. History by Eminent Egyptologists. London.

1929. Great Ones of Ancient Egypt. Portraits by Winifred Brunton. Historical Studies by various Egyptologists
