= Guy Brunton =

British archaeologist and Egyptologist (1878–1948)

Guy Brunton OBE
- Born: 18 July 1878; London, England
- Died: 17 October 1948 (aged 70); White River, Mpumalanga, South Africa
- Occupations: Egyptologist, archaeologist
- Spouse: Winifred Brunton (m. 1906)

Guy Brunton OBE (18 July 1878 – 17 October 1948) was born in Beckenham, England. His parents were Spencer Brunton and Jane Swift. He was an English archaeologist and Egyptologist who aided in the discovery of the Badarian predynastic culture. Not much is known about his early childhood except that he had a fondness for books, and he discovered his passion for Egypt through reading.

== Early life ==
As a child, Guy read a book about Egypt written by Amelia Edwards.This book sparked his lifelong passion for Egypt and reading. After Edwards' book, Guy spent much of his time reading in the Edwards Library at the University College of London. In 1896, at the age of 18, he left London and traveled to South Africa. Guy Brunton stayed in South Africa for more than the next ten years.

== Education and married life ==
On 28 April 1906, when he was 28 years old, he married Winifred Newberry, in Prynnsberg, Clocolan. Winifred Newberry was a member of one of the country's richest families, and in Five years later, in 1911 Guy and Winifred Brunton left South Africa and returned to London, where they studied under Flinders Petrie and Margaret Alice Murray in the Egyptology program offered at the University College of London-UCL For the next two years, Guy and Winifred Brunton were mostly under the tutelage of Margaret Murray. Guy and Winifred Brunton were some of the first students to study under Margaret Murray in the new revamped program at UCL.Guy, Winifred, and four other classmates formed a small, tight-knit group. This small group of six students was called 'The Gang,' and consisted of Guy and Winifred Brunton, Georgina Aitken, Myrtle Broome, Emma Benson, and Reginald Engelbach.

== Career ==
After two years in the UCL Egyptology program, Guy dug from 1912 to 1914 under the direction of Flinders Petrie in Lahun. It was during this first dig at Lahun that he assisted in the discovery of the leftover treasure of Princess Sithathoriunet from the 12th dynasty. In the tomb of Sat-Hathor-Ant, the dig team found various remnants of different types of royal jewelry, beads, stones, personal effects, and canopic jars, all of which had been left behind after tomb robbers had raided it previously. The tomb of Sat-Hathor-Ant was short in its height, and the items found within had to be carefully recovered. Guy took over the recovery effort, working day and night for seven days in a space only big enough for him to crawl through. The princess's tomb was labeled tomb eight by the dig team, and the items discovered within were well documented by Guy and his dig crew. Many of the recovered items from tomb eight were either kept in Cairo at the Cairo Museum or were taken back to London, where they were put on display. The pieces on display in London were later sold by Petrie to the Metropolitan Museum of Art in New York City, but Guy took advantage of the discovery and honed his skills organizing, writing, and cataloging the pieces.

== Military and Post war life ==
From 1914 to 1918, he left Lahun to serve in the British Army during the First World War. After his service in the war, he returned to Lahun from 1919 to 1921. Brunton conducted extensive excavations in Middle Egypt during the 1920s. After his second season digging at Lahun, Brunton worked with Gertrude Caton Thompson at the sites of Qau and Badari from 1922 to 1931. The discoveries made at Qua and Badari by Brunton, Thompson, and their digging crew gave life to the understanding of the culture(s) that existed in Predynastic Middle and Upper Egypt. Among some of the artifacts found here at the Qua and Badari sites were pottery and a Coptic Gospel of St. John. Working under the auspices of the British School of Archaeology in Egypt, he excavated several sites in the region, particularly in the Asyut Governorate (including Mostagedda, Badari, Matmar, and Qua el-Kebir). These excavations were crucial in identifying and defining the Badarian culture, a prehistoric culture in Upper Egypt that predates the more well-known Predynastic and Pharaonic periods. After his time digging at Qua and Badari, Brunton dug at Der Tasa. In 1931 he became an assistant director of the Cairo Museum. During his time at the Cairo Museum he worked to organize the galleries and the displays. He retired to South Africa in 1948, Transvaal, White River, dying shortly after later on October 17,1948.

== Influences and important people ==
Guy Brunton maintained a close working relationship with his wife Winifred in the field of Egyptology and Archaeology. Winifred attended the same Egyptology program at UCL at the same time as her husband.As an artistic individual, Winifred preserved many of their discoveries in water colour paintings she created. Often times Winifred used Guy and or their recent Archaeology discoveries as inspiration for her artwork. At the time of Guy's death, in October of 1948, they had been married for more than forty years. Winifred died more than ten after Guy in Clocolan, South Africa on January 29, 1959.

Guy Brunton maintained a close working relationship with his mentor Flinders Petrie throughout his career. Working closely with each other they made many Archaeological discoveries and co-authored several written works together. Throughout his career in Egyptology Brunton worked to master the Archaeological techniques pioneered by Petrie in the field. However, Brunton, also pioneered, polished, perfected, and defined many other archaeological techniques during his career as well. Another person of influence in Brunton's life was Margaret Alice Murray. Murray led many of the programs at UCL teaching many students throughout the years including members of "The Gang". She was responsible for running many programs at UCL including the Egyptology program at UCL.This same program prepared Brunton for his career in Egyptology and Archaeology.

== Publications ==
- Brunton, Guy (1927). Qau and Badari I. British School of Archaeology in Egypt/Egyptian Research Account. Vol. 44. London: Bernard Quaritch.
- — (1928). Qau and Badari II. British School of Archaeology in Egypt/Egyptian Research Account. Vol. 45. London: Bernard Quaritch.
- —; Caton-Thompson, Gertrude (1928). The Badarian civilisation and predynastic remains near Badari. British School of Archaeology in Egypt/Egyptian Research Account. Vol. 46. London: Bernard Quaritch.
- — (1930). Qau and Badari III. British School of Archaeology in Egypt/Egyptian Research Account. Vol. 50. London: Bernard Quaritch.
- — (1937). Mostagedda and the Tasian culture. British Museum Expeditions to Middle Egypt. Vol. 1. London: Bernard Quaritch.
- — (1948). Matmar. British Museum Expeditions to Middle Egypt. Vol. 2. London: Bernard Quaritch.
