= Man-prisoner (hieroglyph) =

Egyptian hieroglyph

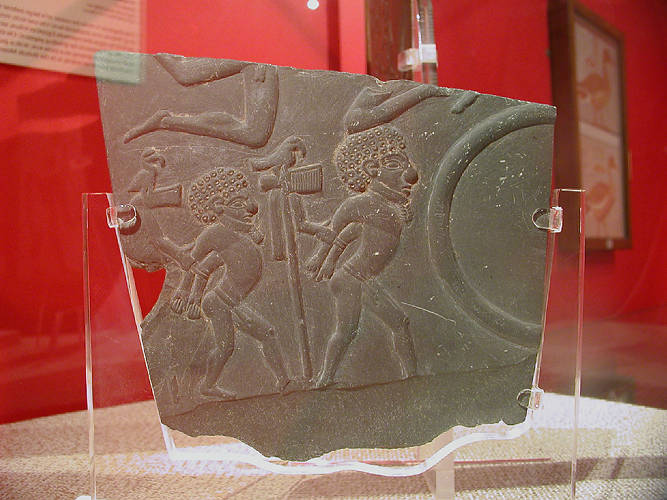
Man-prisoner hieroglyph – iconography from predynastic Battlefield Palette.

A13
Man-(prisoner)
(version 1)
in hieroglyphs

A13 R13
Man-(prisoner)
(variant, with stake)
in hieroglyphs

The ancient Egyptian Man-prisoner is one of the oldest hieroglyphs from Ancient Egypt. An iconographic portrayal from predynastic Egypt eventually led to its incorporation into the writing system of the Egyptian language. Not only rebels from towns or districts, but foreigners from battle were being portrayed.

The nine bows concept of internal ancient Egyptian rebels, as well as 'foreign' rebels, began with actual bows, for example under Pharaoh Djoser's feet on his seated statue, 3rd Dynasty; (his feet rest upon 9 bows). The more prolonged use of the 'prisoner' hieroglyph in language and iconography continued into New Kingdom, and Ptolemaic times with the prisoner hieroglyph, as a "foreign rebel people" presented and named inside of a "cartouche". The 'cartouche' was often identified on its perimeter ring with the fortifying blocks of a city fortification, representing either the people, or their city-state location.

== Example from the Hierakonpolis Palette ==
One of the oldest examples of the Man-prisoner hieroglyph is found on the predynastic palette, the Battlefield Palette. As some of the palettes involved animals, hunting, and weapons, captives were taken and displayed. Since the prisoners are shown, battles are implied. The famous Libyan Palette shows towns or districts, surrounded by enclosures, presumed walled fortifications, against outside forces or people.

== Language usage of Man-prisoner hieroglyph ==
Since Egyptian walled reliefs often told stories, battle descriptions with prisoners is common. Of note, stories, and hieroglyphs of piled dismembered body parts are known, partially to show proof of the body counts.

=== 3000 years later: Rosetta Stone use ===
The Rosetta Stone, (the surviving second half, the Nubayrah Stele being the surviving first half), lists 22 reasons for honoring the pharaoh Ptolemy V-(Ptolemy Epiphanous-(with pr (hieroglyph) Eucharistos - the Greek on the stone), and the first third of the Rosetta Stone ends the list of 22. Line 1 summarizes what to do with the rebels from the town-(district): to display them on stakes (in the Demotic script) so everybody will be shown the example). The Nubayrah Stele uses four of the second version of the Man-prisoner hieroglyph, first in line N-19, and three times in line N-22, near the summary of the rebel story. Line 1 of the Rosetta Stone tells of the impaling on the stakes-(the branch hieroglyph). Shoshenq I portrayed 39 cartouched at Karnak after his campaign.

== Nine bows representation ==
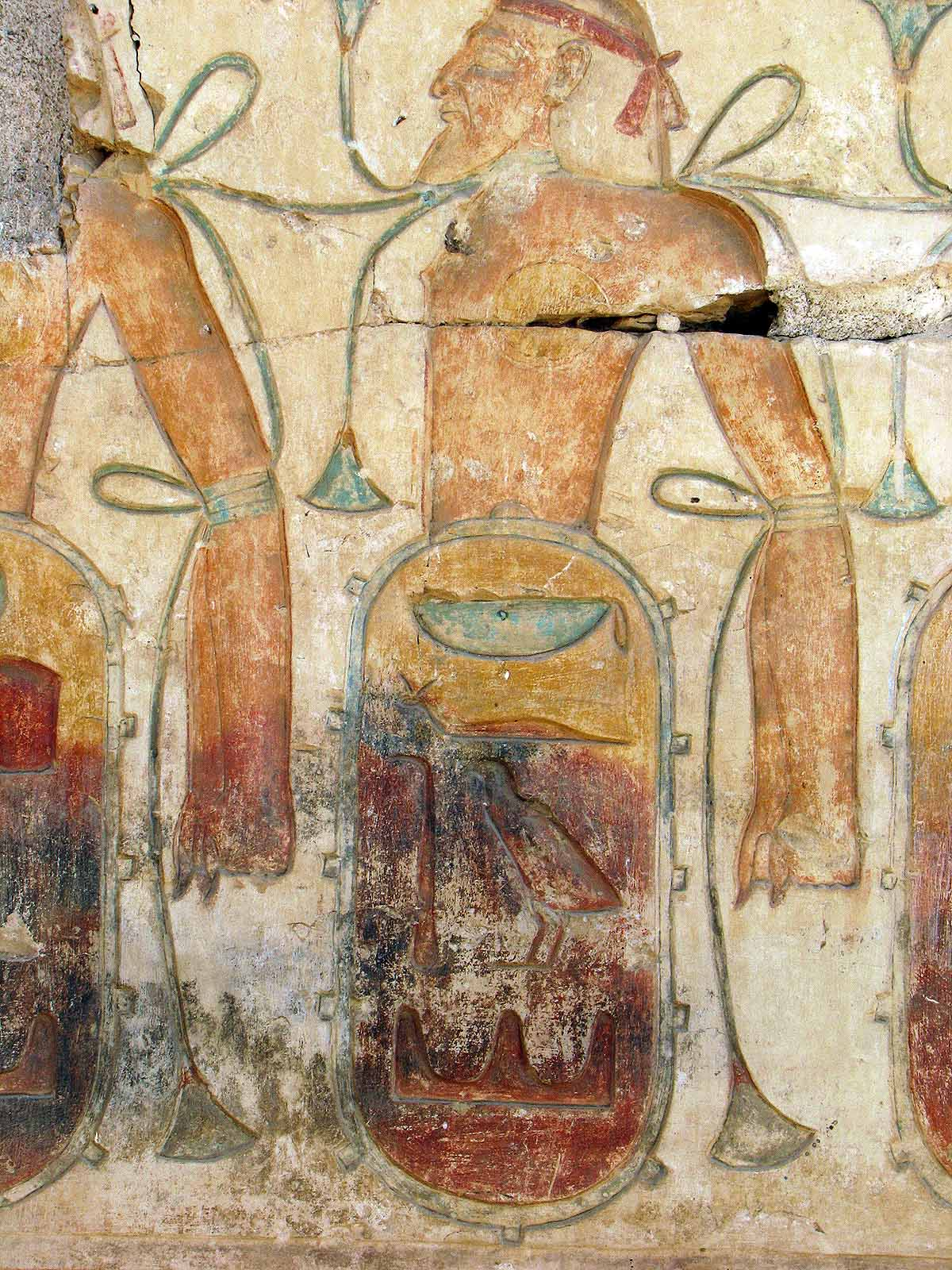
The Keftiu- (Caphtor)-K-f-t-U-foreign land determinative; (defeated peoples, Ramses II Temple at Abydos.

An example of the "cartouche" form of the man-prisoner hieroglyph is found in sequences of defeated peoples. Campaigns in the Levant especially involved defeating city-state regions, one after the other. Upon returning from successful campaigns, the series of defeated peoples were portrayed in public temples.

The Ramses pharaohs, are noted for this, (Ramesses II, Ramesses III); also Shoshenq I as portrayed in the controversial Rohl book of Pharaohs and Kings. At Karnak Shoshenq I portrayed 39 cartouches of nine bows, in 3 rows of cartouches; each rebel group or state, is named in egyptian hieroglyphs.

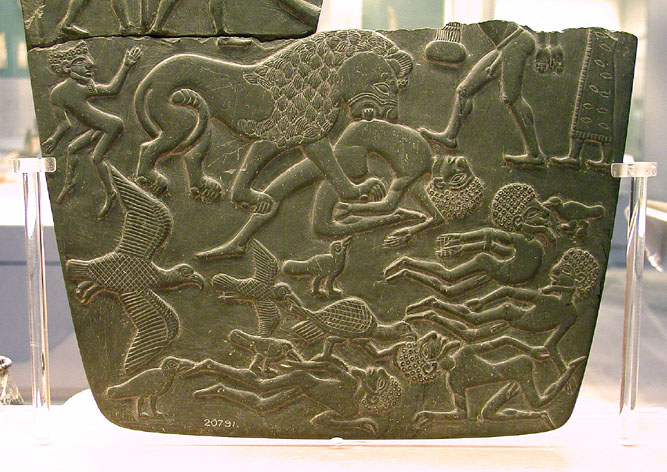
Prisoner, being held from behind on the Battlefield Palette

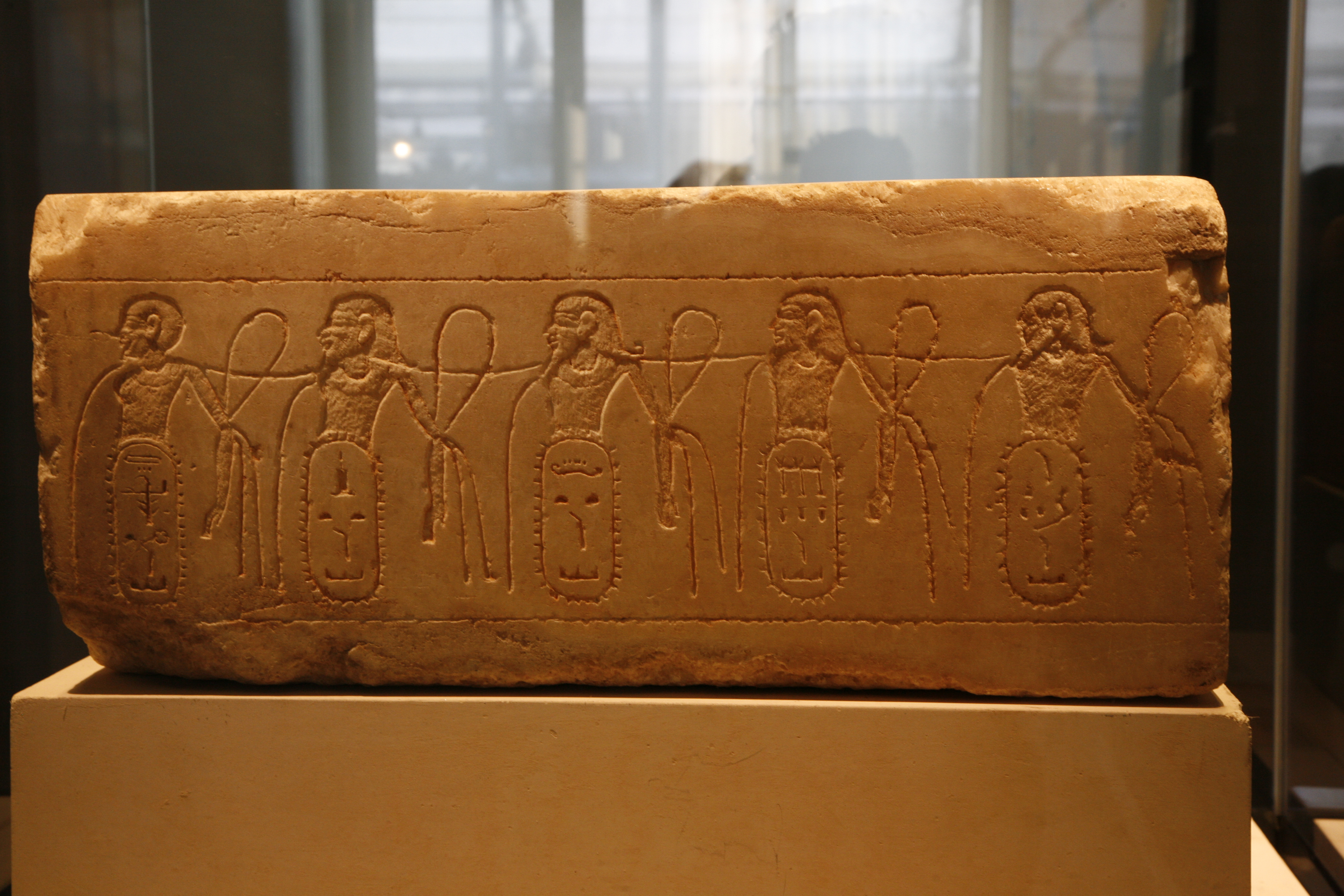
The Man-(prisoner) variant as incorporated into identifying cartouches-(a list of captive/defeated peoples)

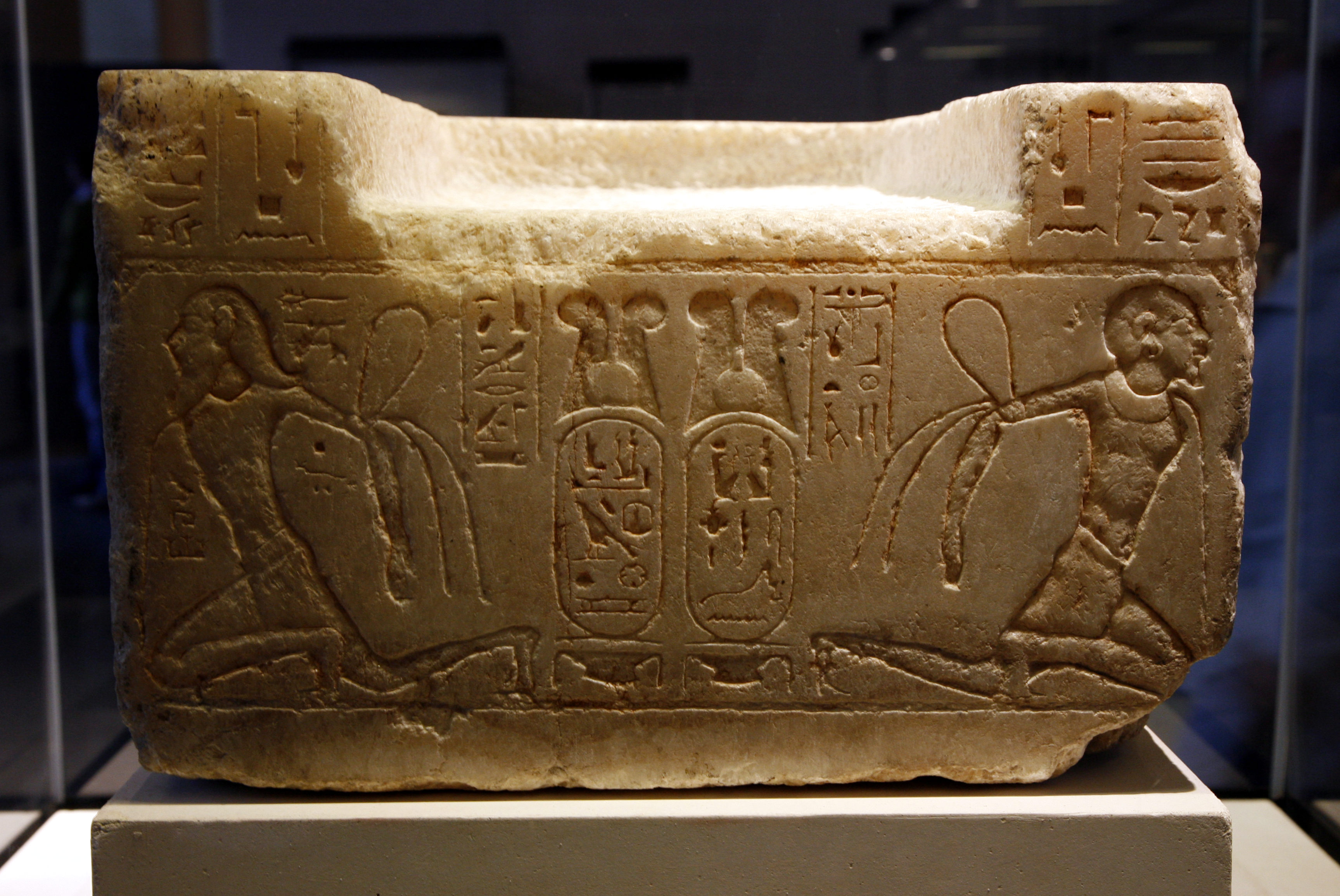
Captives-(prisoners)-a memorial to Nectanebo II

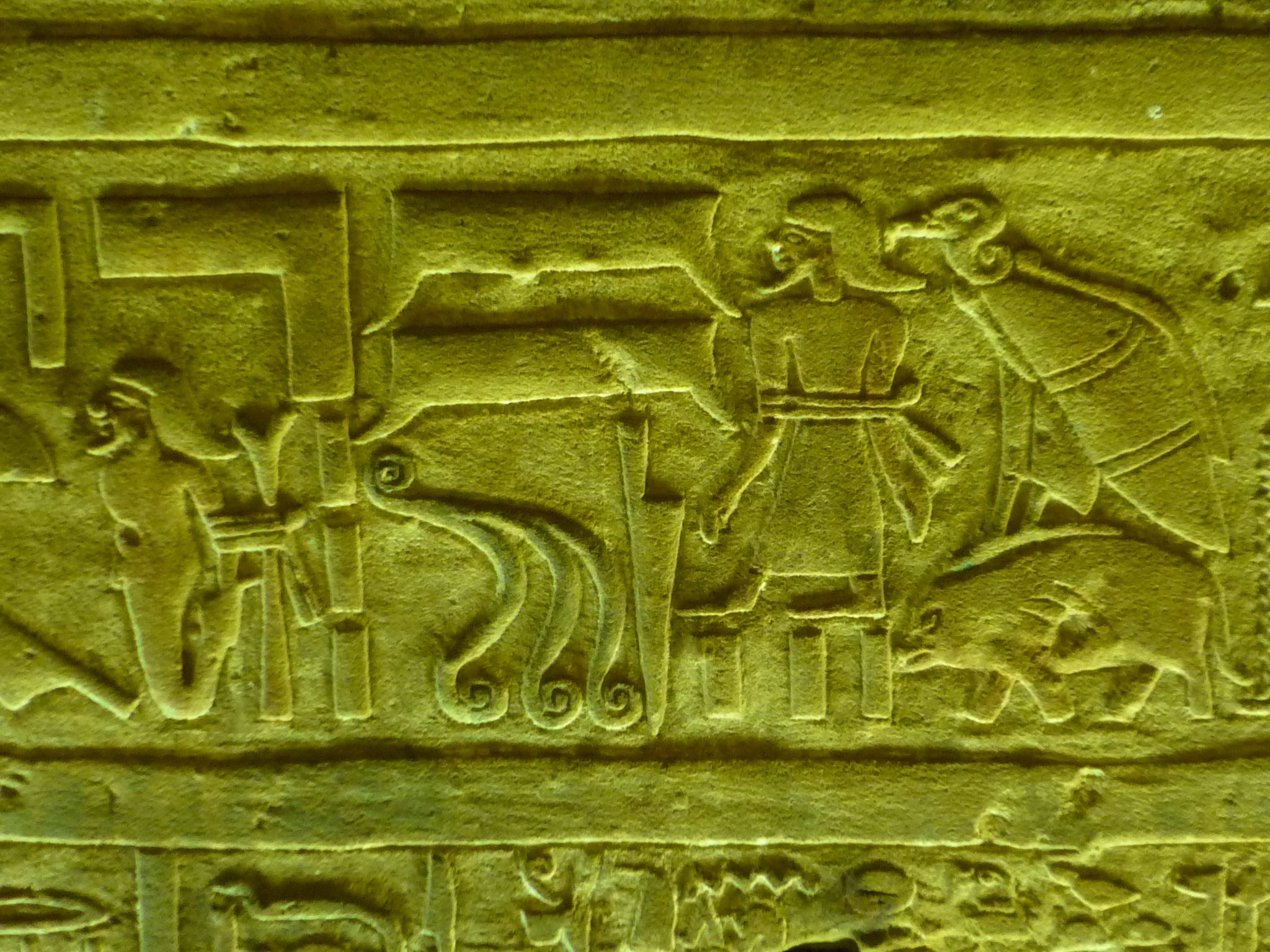
Complex hieroglyphs; (Note the "Sky"/Heaven hieroglyph: N1 in a stylized form)

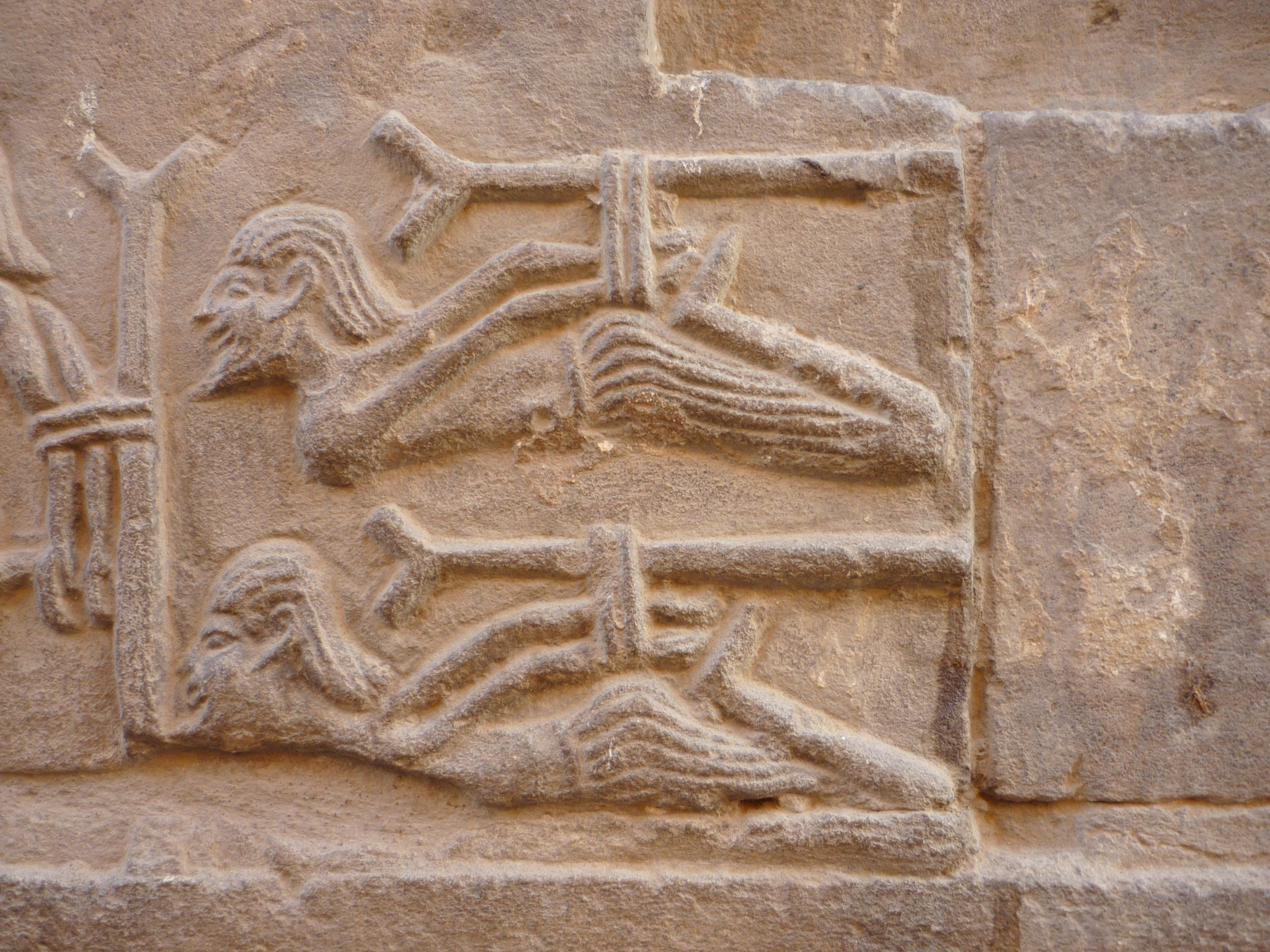
Prisoner ligatured with Vertical Stake
(stake: a Prop of the Sky-(the Four Quarters of the Heavens))

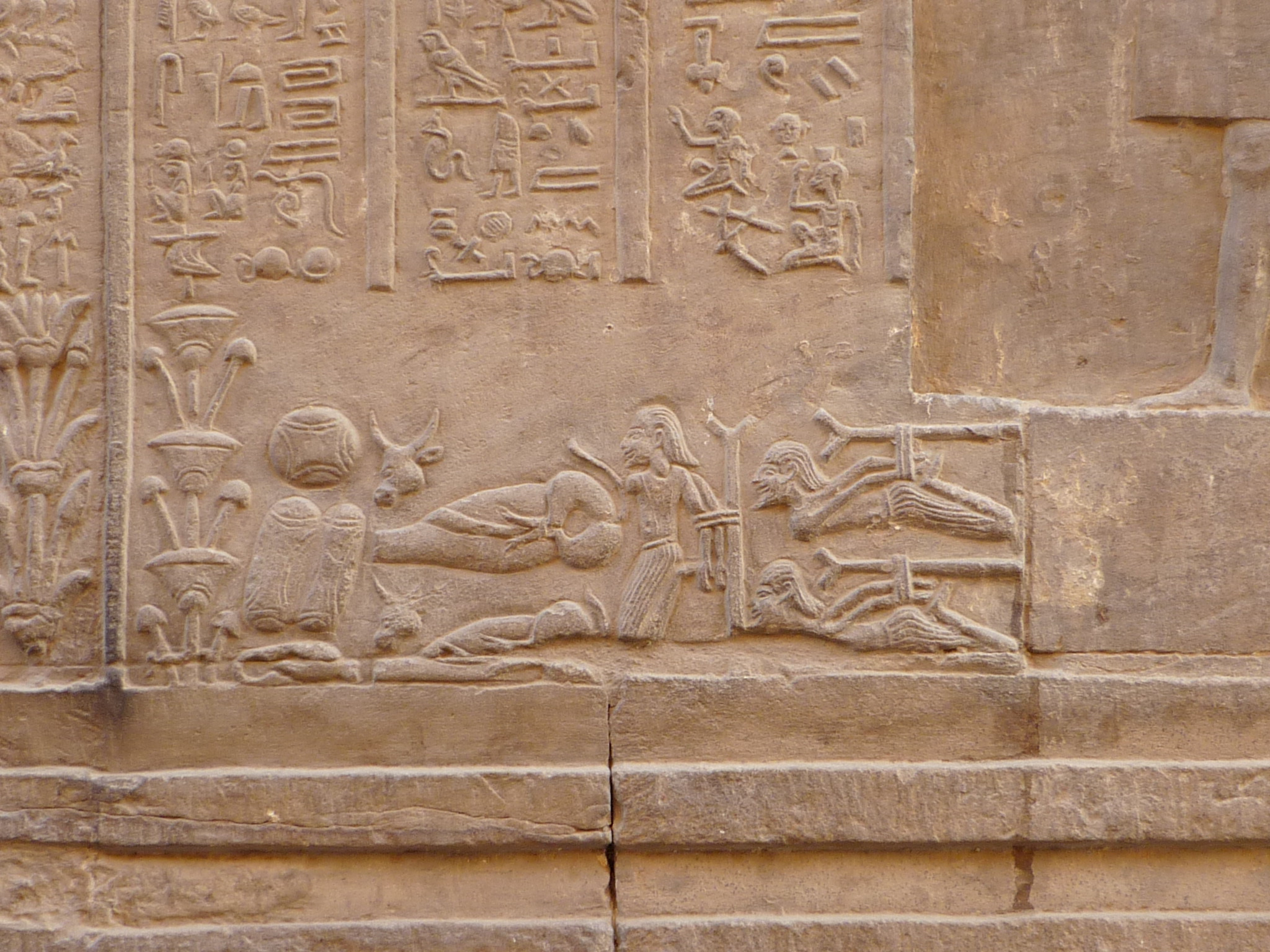
(Close-up below columns of hieroglyphs) Prisoner-tied-to-Stake

== See also ==
- Gardiner's Sign List#A. Man and his Occupations
- Gardiner's Sign List#R. Temple Furniture and Sacred Emblems
- List of Egyptian hieroglyphs
