= Min Palette =

Ancient Egyptian cosmetic palette

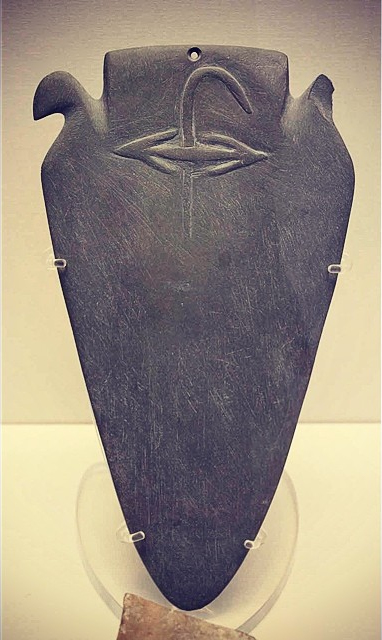
Mudstone Min palette with hieroglyphs in relief. Late Predynastic, Naqada III. 3250-3100 BC. From El-Amra. The exact meaning of there early signs is unclear. The horizontal sign resembles that later used to write the name of the god Min.

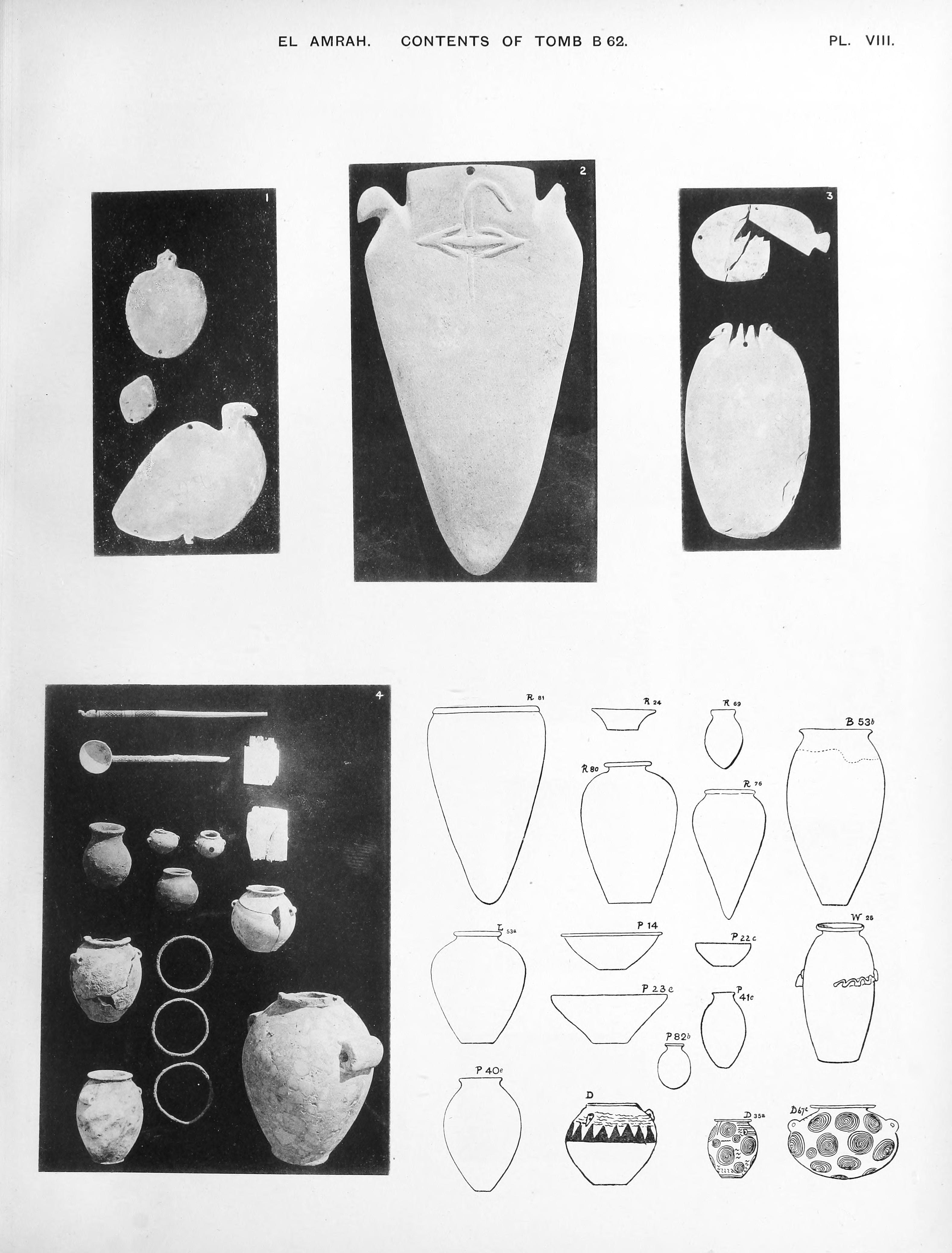
Content of Tomb b62, with the Min palette, El-Amrah.

The Min Palette, or El Amrah Palette is an Predynastic Egyptian cosmetic palette from El-Amrah, Egypt (for the Amratian Period), found in Naqada, tomb B62. It is held in the British Museum, no. 35501.

== Description ==
The Min Palette is a flat slate palette, unadorned, with no iconographic scenes.

Two topics are displayed on the palette. The Symbol of Min, a compound-type hieroglyph arrangement, is centered at the top of the palette, and comprises 1/4 of the palette's front. The other motifs are opposed-facing bird heads on each top corner; the heads are small, with a thin neck, about a tenth the height of the palette, and the right head is damaged.

A small suspension hole is centered on the palette's top.

=== Min's emblem ===
The Emblem of Min on the palette is a typographic ligature of two Egyptian hieroglyphs–R23 and S39. The later horizontal form of the Min symbol (hieroglyph), (consisting of two opposing-faced arrows), is shown in an archaic form. Centered vertically overlaying the Min hieroglyph is a vertical "crook" or staff, the version of the 'straight staff', (see Crook-staff (Luwian hieroglyph)).

== See also ==
- List of ancient Egyptian palettes
- Cosmetic palette
- Min (god)
