= Hunters Palette =

Cosmetic palette from prehistoric Egypt

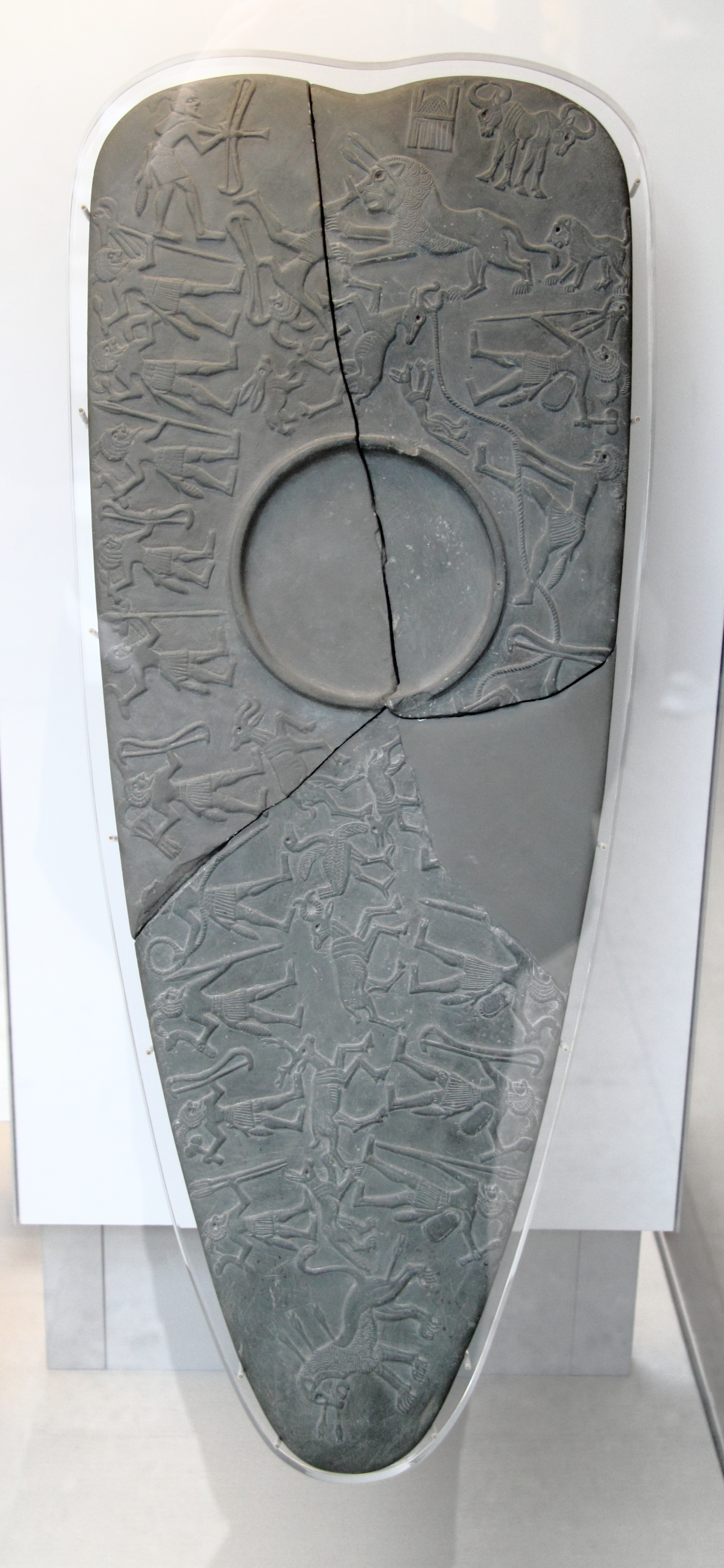
- Hunters Palette with pieces connected
- Material: Schist
- Size: c. 66 cm x 26 cm
- Created: 31st century BC (circa)
- Discovered: Abydos.
- Present location: British Museum, Louvre
- Identification: British Museum, EA 20790, EA 20792, Louvre E 11254

The Hunters Palette or Lion Hunt Palette is a c. 3100 BCE cosmetic palette from the Naqada III period of late prehistoric Egypt. The palette is broken: part is held by the British Museum and part is in the collection of the Louvre. It was initially registered as discovered in the El-Amarna region, probably the result of confusion with other objects, and Budge later stated it came from Abydos.

== Content ==
The Hunters Palette shows a complex iconography of lion hunting as well as the hunt of other animals such as birds, desert hares, and gazelle types; one gazelle is being contained by a rope. The weapons used in the twenty-man hunt are the bow and arrow, mace, throwing sticks, flint knives, and spears. Two iconographic conjoined bull-forefronts adorn the upper right alongside a hieroglyphic-like symbol similar to the "shrine" hieroglyph, sḥ.

O21

== Details ==
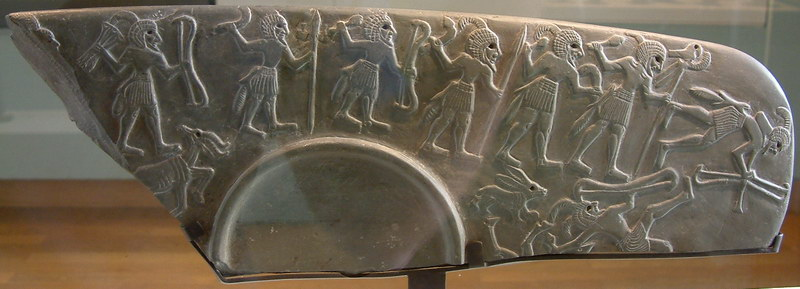
Louvre fragment showing various weapons

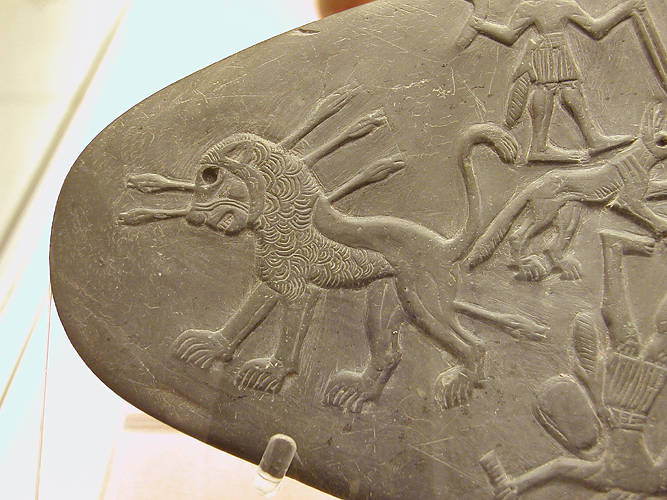
Hunters Palette, details, especially a lion's body with arrows.

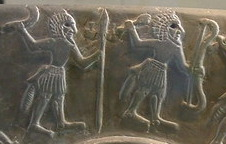
Hunters detail

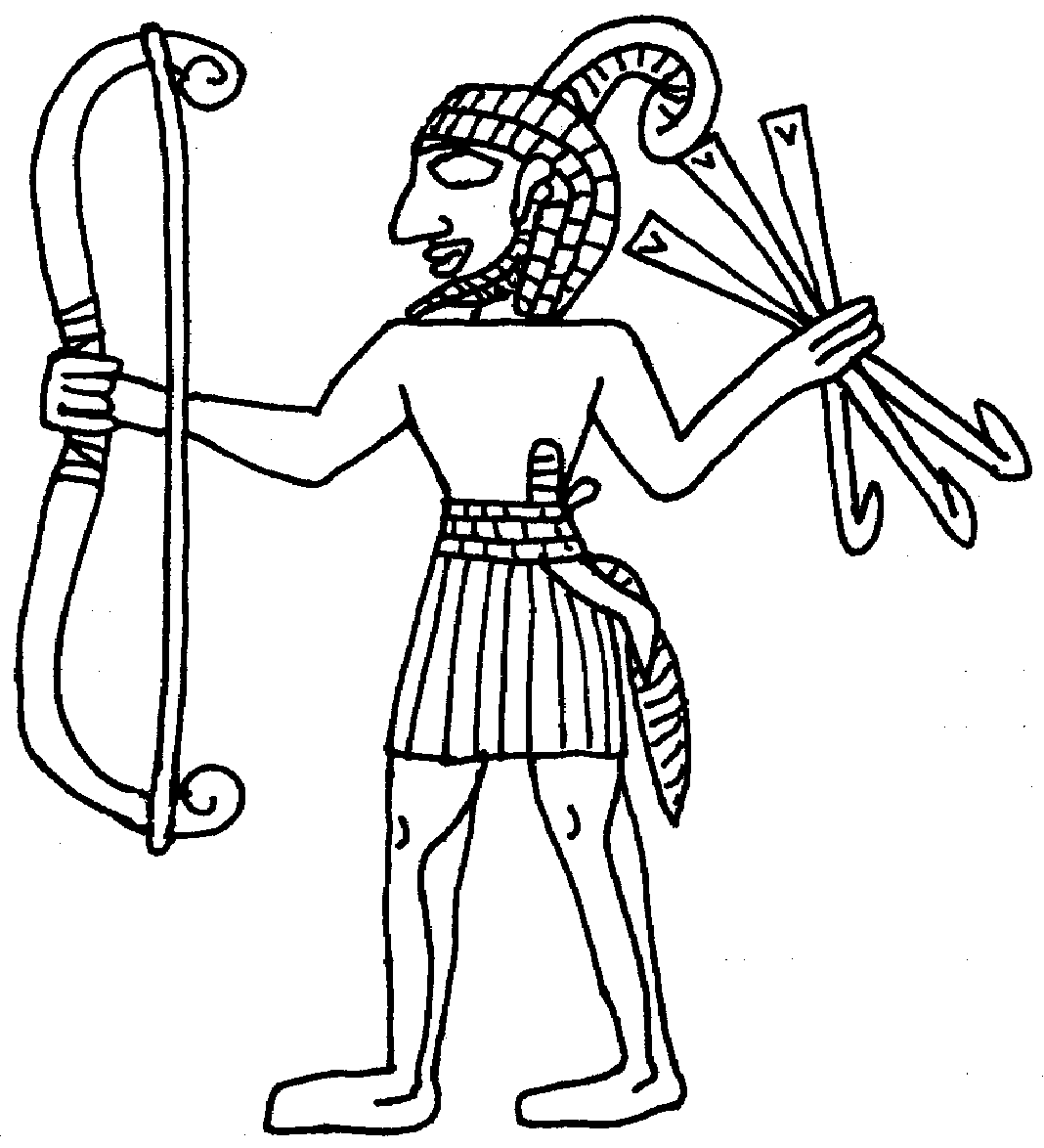
Drawing of a hunter.

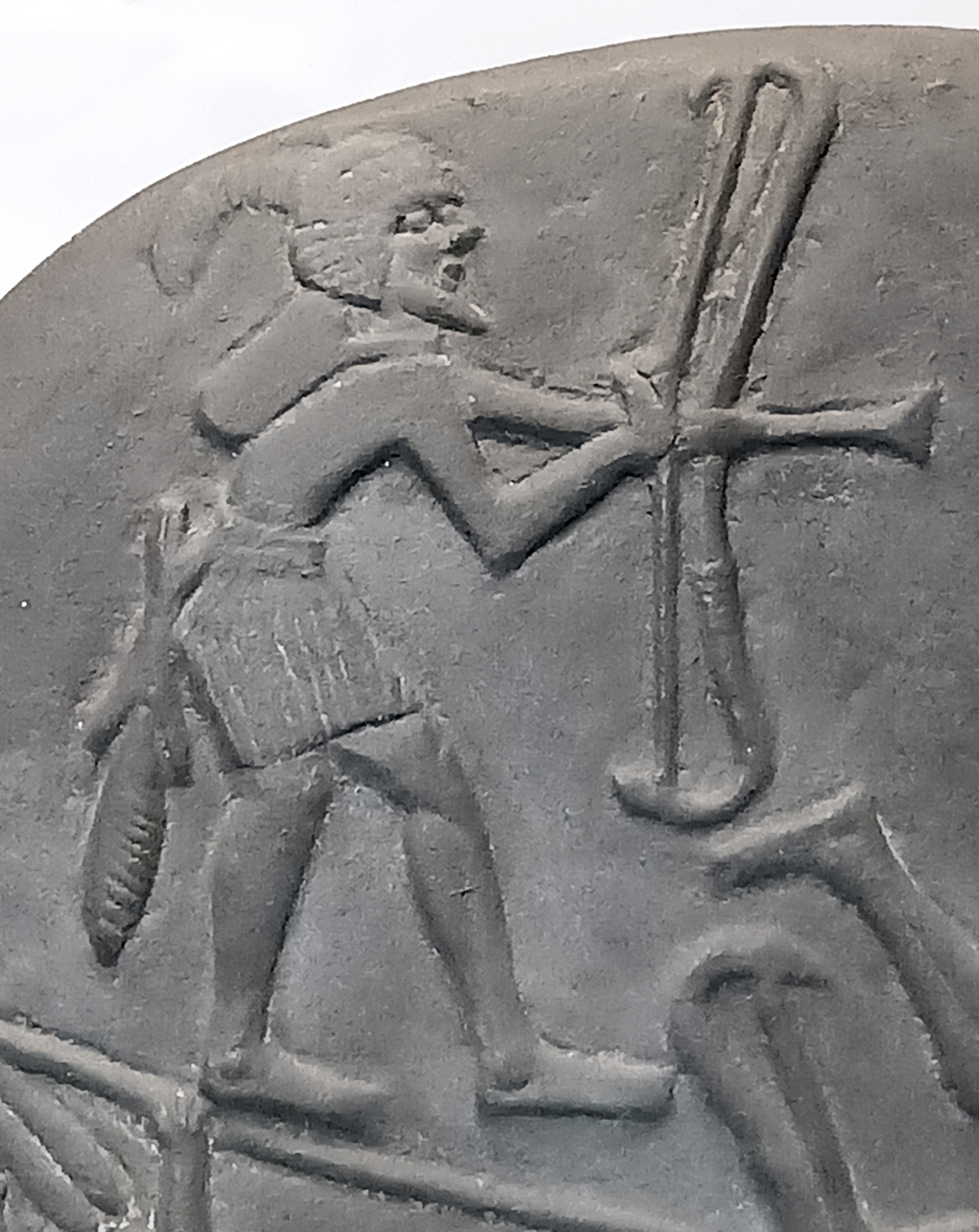
Hunter with bow

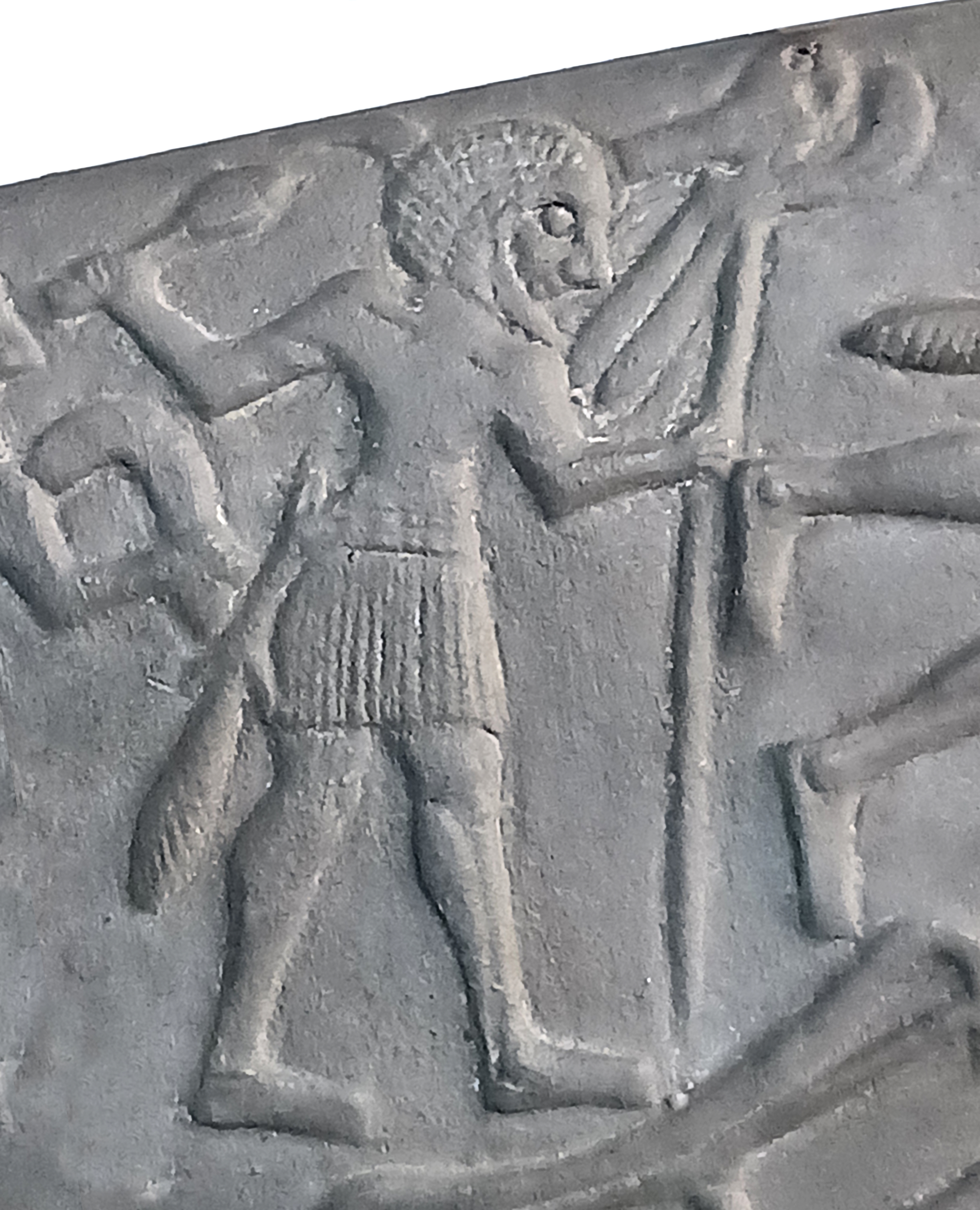
Hunter's with staff

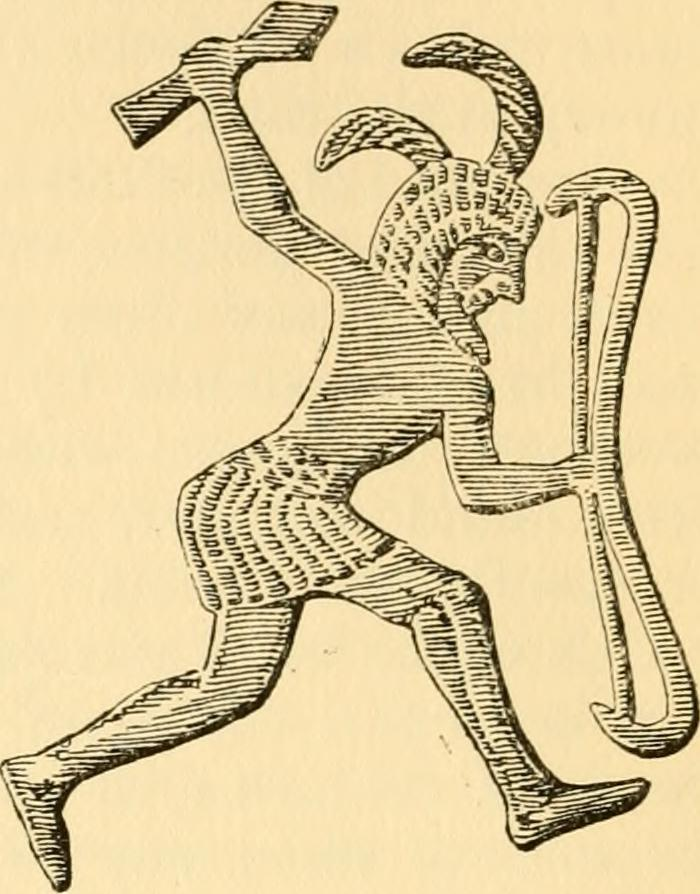
Drawing of a hunter.

== See also ==
- List of ancient Egyptian palettes
