= Bull Palette =

Ancient Egyptian greywacke palette

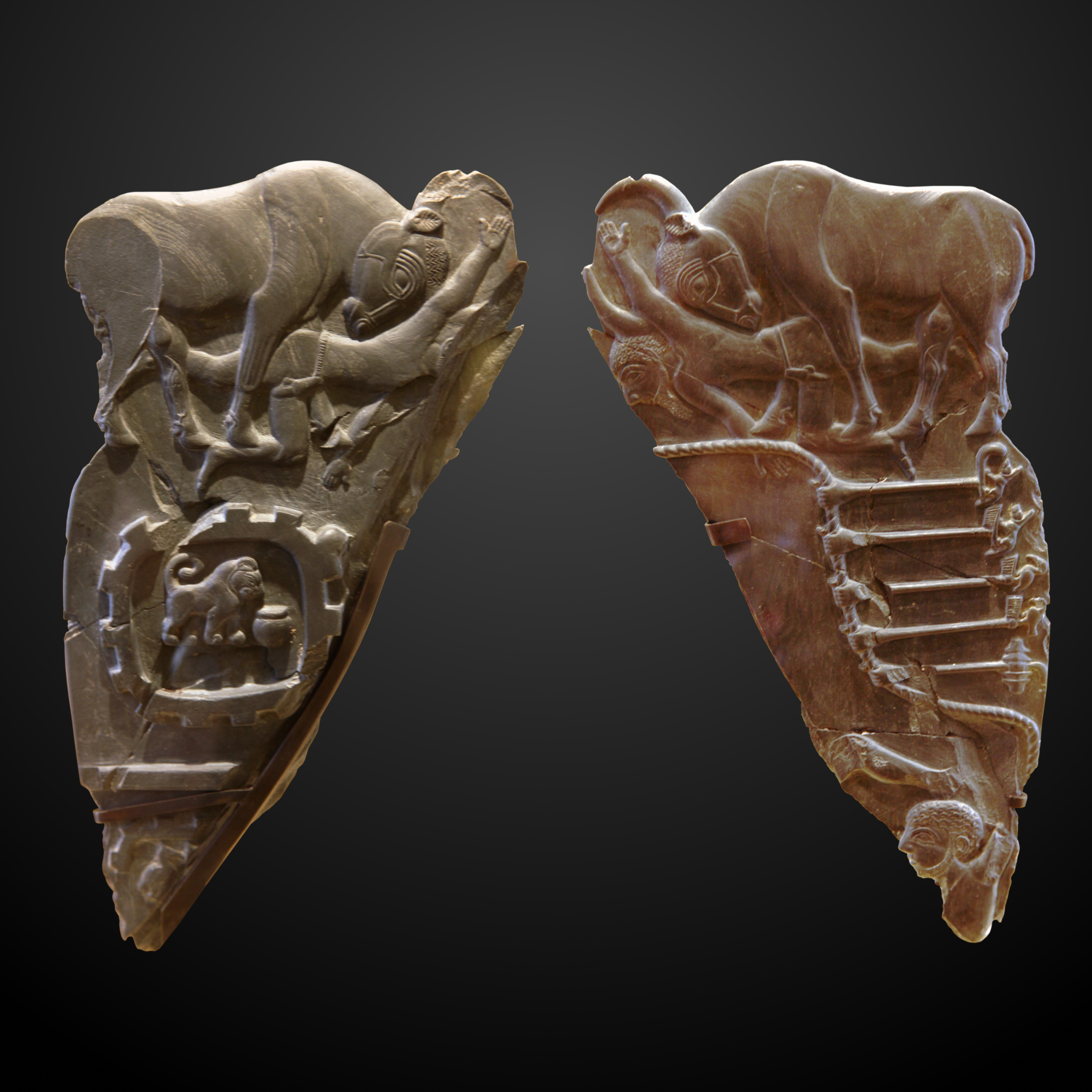
- Material: Greywacke
- Height: 26.5 cm
- Width: 14.5 cm
- Created: c. 3100 BC
- Discovered: before 2007; Egypt
- Present location: Paris, Ile-de-France, France

The Bull Palette (French: palette célébrant une victoire) is the fragment of an Ancient Egyptian greywacke palette, carved in low relief and used, at least in principle, as a cosmetic palette for the grinding of cosmetics. It is dated to Naqada III, the final two centuries of the fourth millennium BC, immediately preceding the Early Dynastic Period). It is in the collection of the Louvre, inventory no. E11255.

The palette is broken and only a portion of half of it remains. Both sides of it are carved, with some figures on each side differing from the other. The accompanying image presents both sides.

The obverse of the cosmetic palette contains a large circular fortified city that is identified in its interior with a "larger-lion-and-'Nu'-(vessel)"–

W24

a hieroglyph represented to the right of the lioness.

The reverse of the cosmetic palette has iconography that became hieroglyphs for the: clenched fist, five standards surmounted by animals, being represented by two hippopotamuses, the "Sacred Ibis", the Horus-Falcon, and the thuderbolt of Min–symbol.

== The palette ==
The Bull Palette (remainder piece about 10 inches (25 cm)) is made of mudstone or schist, and is etched in more atypical medium to medium-low relief than similar cosmetic palettes. A presumed 'fortified city' on the obverse (front) in the upper register has a major loss of the city-rectangle on upper left showing this medium-level bas relief. The register below appears to be a smaller area of the palette, and has the remains, (approximately one quarter), of a second fortified city; a bird is one identifier in the second city-fortified interior, with the rest missing.

=== Obverse ===
The obverse (front) of the Bull Pallette has the top left iconography of the Bull overpowering a Warrior. The right half is missing, with a probable second bull facing the first, as part of the upper borders, for both the left and the right.

The rest of the obverse (front) contains a large "fortified-walled-city", and is identified in the center with a larger-lion-and-'Nu'-(vessel) that contains a lioness and the pot; a smaller register section below contains the upper left quarter of a second fortified-city. The second city is of smaller size than the identified city in the upper register.

obverse
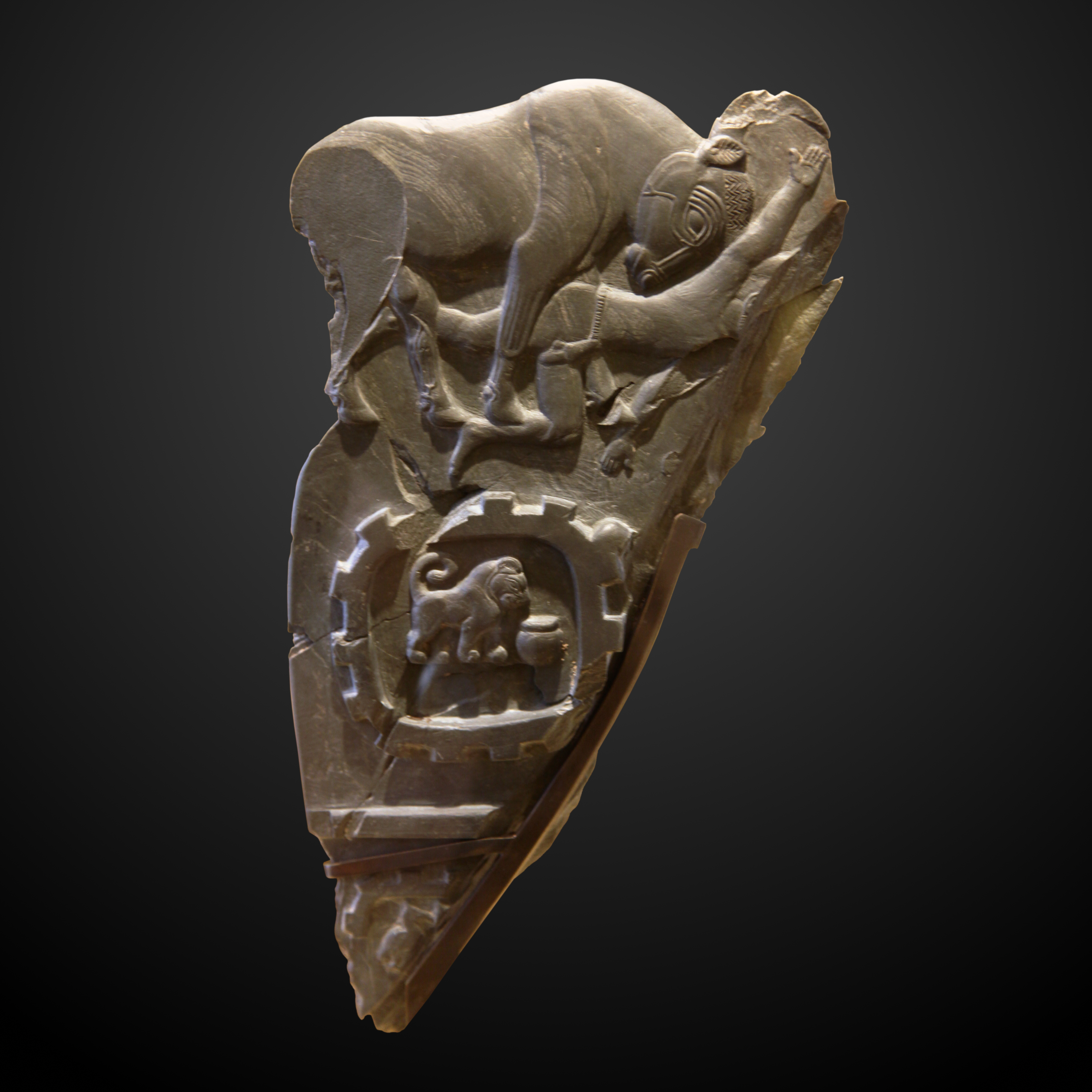
Obverse of the palette

=== Reverse ===
The reverse (back) of the palette has the same bull overpowering a warrior motif.

A rope appears to encircle, or is at least part of the entire reverse, as one of the reverse motifs. The remaining piece-(of this broken cosmetic palette) has possibly one of the more important motifs preserved in the palettes corpus. Five standards are shown collectively on the right of the palette, and each is an iat standard (hieroglyph), but notably the base of each standard transforms into a 'clenched hand', which embraces the large-diameter rope encircling the reverse side.

The five standards are:

1. A hippopotamus with open mouth
2. A hippopotamus with open mouth
3. The "Sacred Ibis"
4. The standing Horus-Falcon
5. Symbol: "Thunderbolt of Min"-(an encircled snake on standard?)

reverse
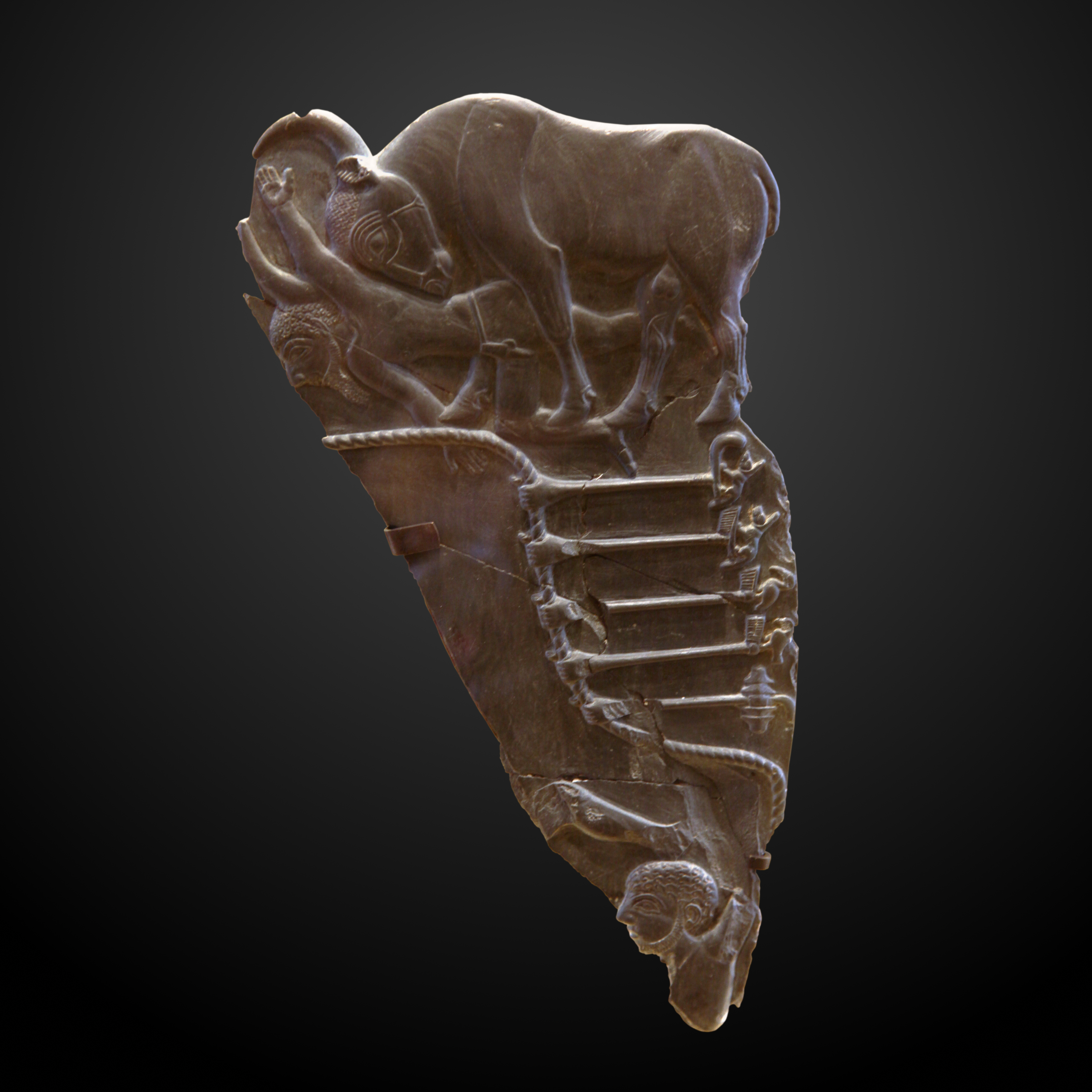
Palette reverse with five standards with animals – falcon, ibis, MIN-thunderbolt, and two animals (hippos?) with open mouths, the Opening of the Way to the North, and the Opening of the Way to the South–(death of hunters?), and each standard beginning with a clenched fist, holding onto the "community rope"

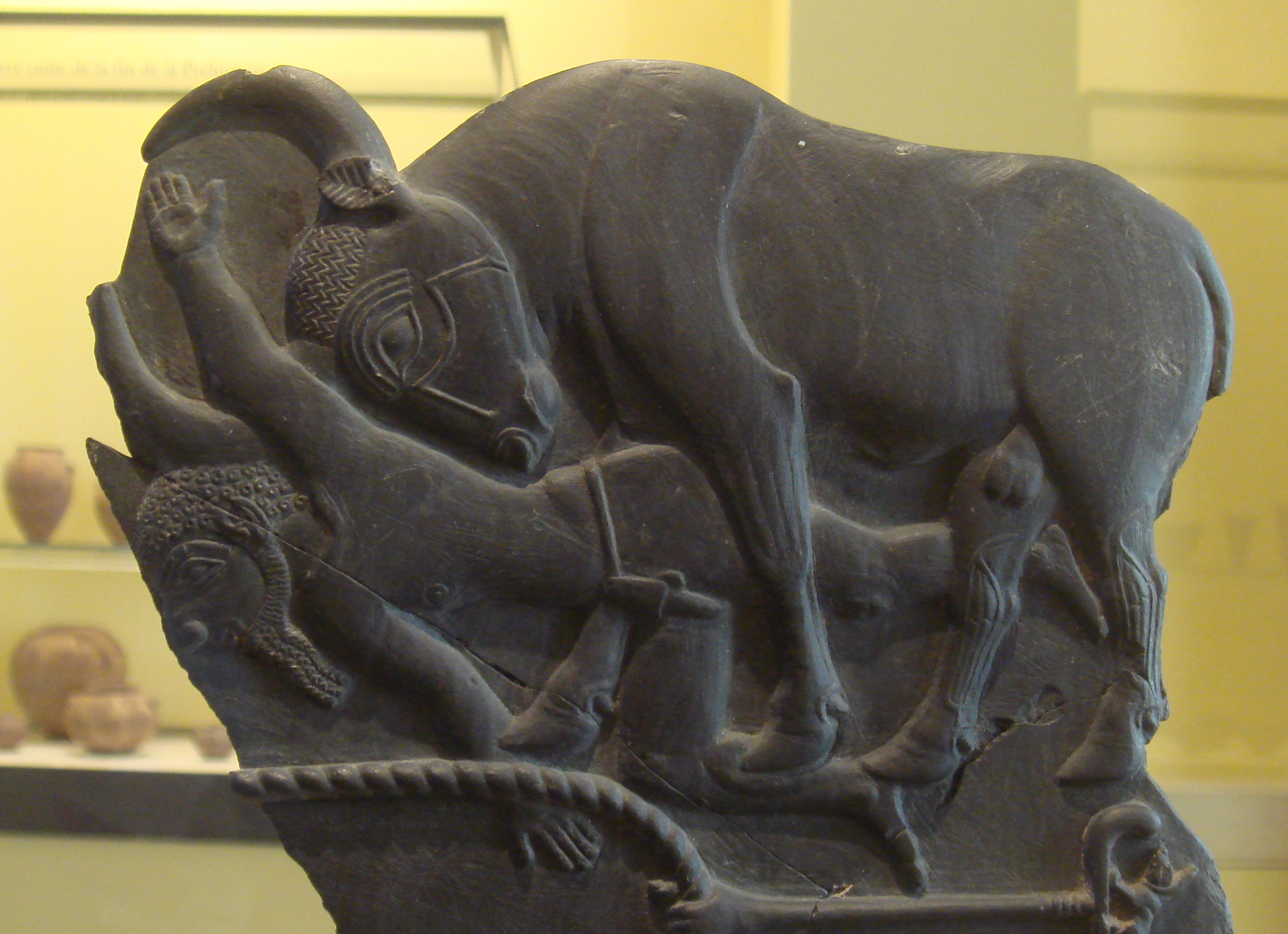
Detail of the bull trampling an enemy on the reverse

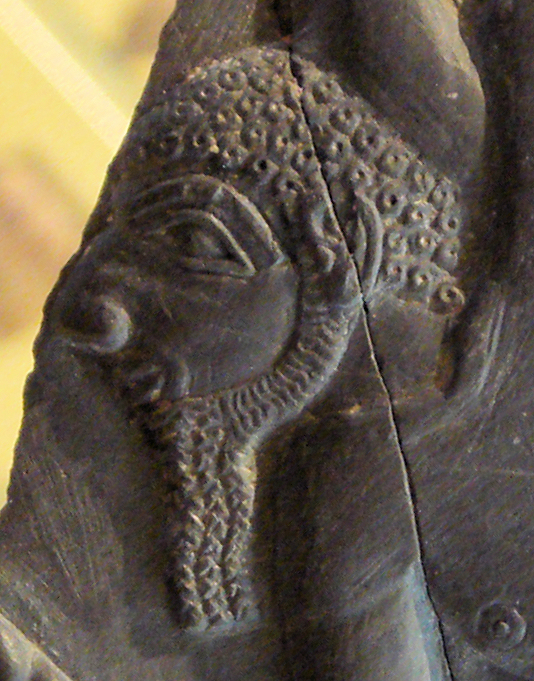
Detail of an enemy being trampled by the bull on the reverse

The palette's reverse contains only two clues to suggest the entire scene on that side of the broken palette. The encircling rope has the bull, a defeated warrior, (and another presumed pair on left), and two other body parts of warriors. Open space (field?) covers space as large, or larger than the two warrior portions. A warrior's leg is shown and is partially fractured-out (chipped), from the bas relief-(the knee portion); adjacent and below the leg, is a perfectly preserved warrior head, with eye, ear, beard, necklace cord, and a "stylized hairdo"-(close cropped).

== Similar motif on Narmer Palette ==
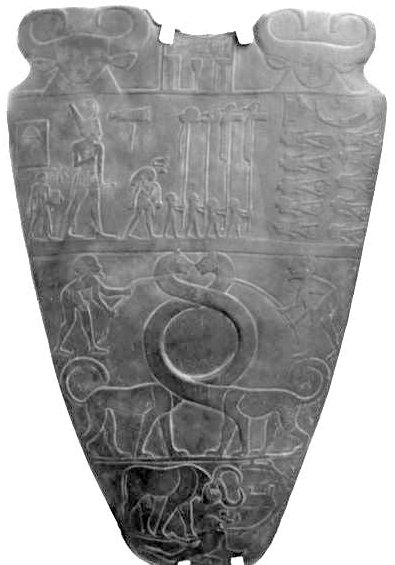
Narmer Palette: front, with bull defeating warrior in lower register; fortifications on right

The motifs of the sides of the palette are presumably the bull overpowering an enemy, the named-fortified-cities, war-scenes, a collection of deities supporting the war-scenery-(on standards). That is a motif appearing on another cosmetic from ancient Egypt, the well-known Narmer Palette, shown here for comparison and to demonstrate the probable size.

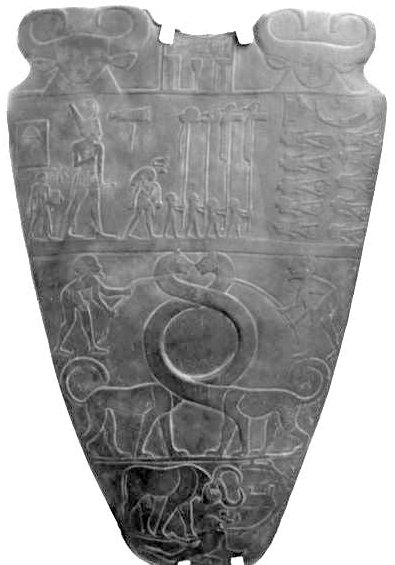
Narmer Palette: bull overpowering warrior motif, (similar)

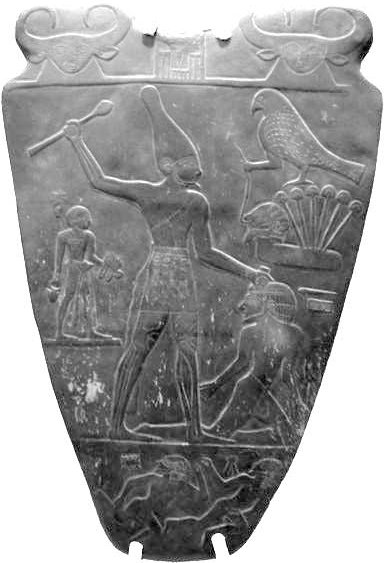
Narmer Palette: a glyph above left-warrior, (similar to a fortification compound?)

== See also ==
- List of ancient Egyptian palettes
- Cosmetic palette
- Gardiner's Sign List
