= Manshiyat Ezzat =

Manshiyat Ezzat also known as Mansheya Ezzat (منشأة عزت) is a village located in the eastern portion of Dakahlia Governorate in Lower Egypt, in the city of El Senbellawein.

During the 1st Dynasty of the Old Kingdom, cemetery plots dating from the reign of Pharaoh Den were built. This resulted in one of the ceremonial cosmetic palettes of predynastic times being interred. The cosmetic palette is one of the more ornate examples, the Manshiyat Ezzat Palette. It contains the twin lion serpopards, as found on the famous Narmer Palette, the cosmetic eyepaint mixing circle, and some mammals endemic to Egypt. Many of the cosmetic palettes of Ancient Egypt were found in the Saqqara area cemeteries to the south.

== See also ==
- List of ancient Egyptian towns and cities
