= List of ancient Egyptian palettes =

A list of a small subset of ancient Egyptian palettes, ranging in the Naqada periods, 4th millennium BC, probably mostly from ~3500 to 3000 BC; some palettes may be from the later period of the earliest 3rd millennium BC.

These cosmetic palettes come in numerous shapes and sizes, and were often found in tombs or graves. They were preceded by a period of palettes called rhomboidal palettes, unadorned, and without the cosmetic mixing circle found on some of the later Naqada period palettes.

== Alphabetical individual listing, (abbreviated) ==
- Battlefield Palette
- "Two-bird heads
  palette (Brooklyn)"
- "Bird palette (Louvre no XXX)"
  (bird-resting, on its feet)
- Double-Bird Palette, ("Anchor Palette")
- Bull Palette
- El Ahaiwah Dog Palette
- Four Dogs Palette, Giraffes Palette
- Oxford Palette
  Minor Hierakonpolis Dogs Palette
- "Fish palette (Louvre dolphin type)"
- New Kingdom: Fish-shaped palette-(Bulti-hieroglyph type); Adorned fish side/ with cosmetic side for daily use.
- Gerzeh Palette
- Barbary Goat Palette
- Trussed-Goose Palette
- Guinea Fowl Palette
- Hunters Palette
- "Ka Palette (no. 1)"
- "Ka Palette (no. 2)"
- Libyan Palette
- Manshiyat Ezzat Palette
- Min Antelope Palette
- Min Palette
- Narmer Palette
- "Turtle palette (no. 1)"-(Louvre)
  (See zoomorphic palette)
- Turtle Palette no. 2

== List of ancient Egyptian Predynastic palettes ==
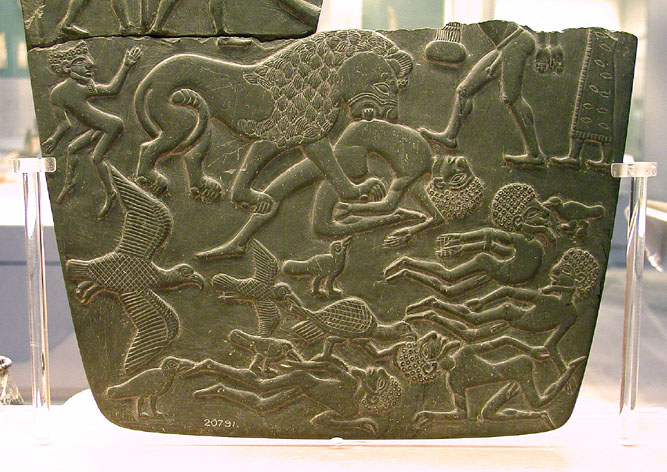
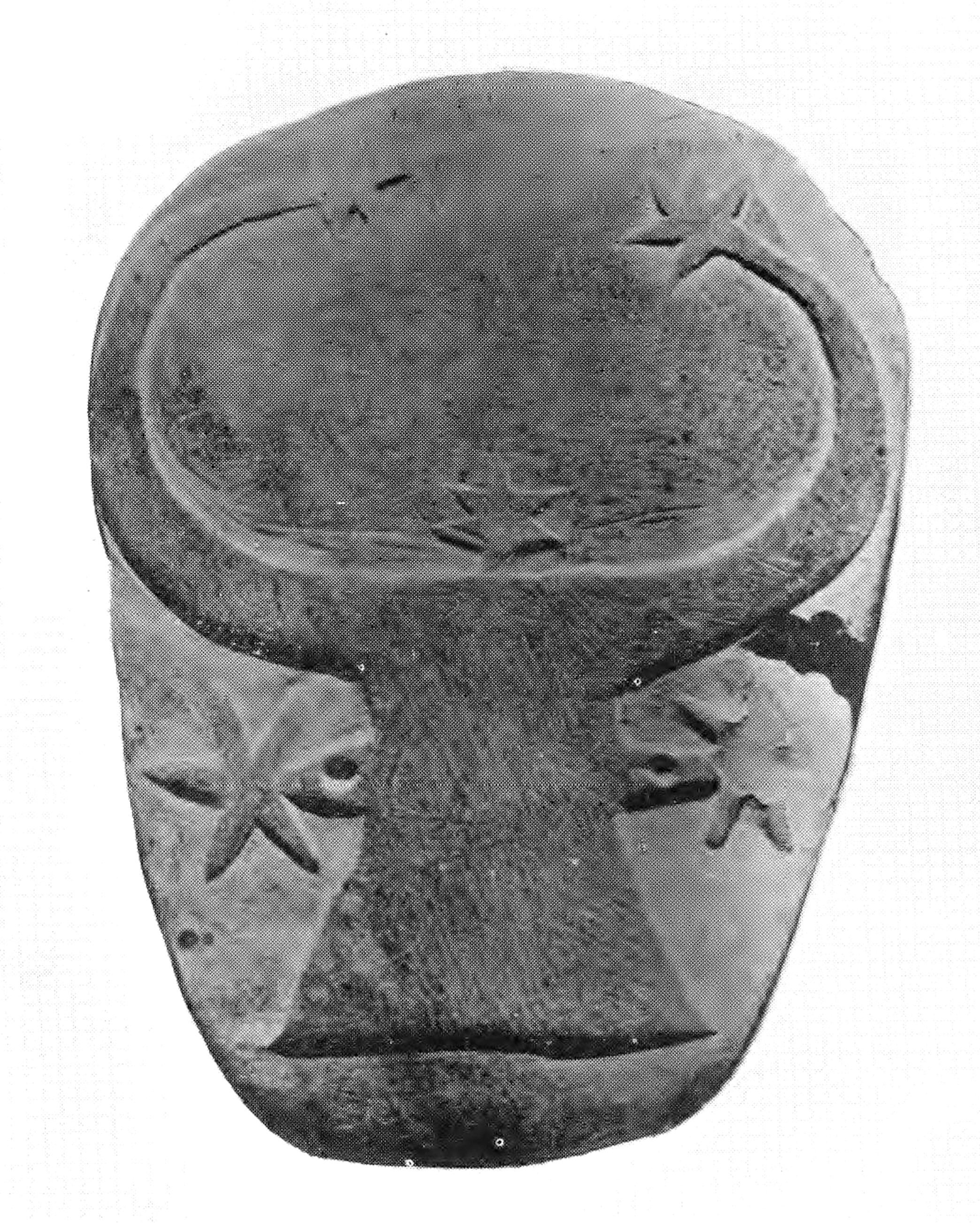
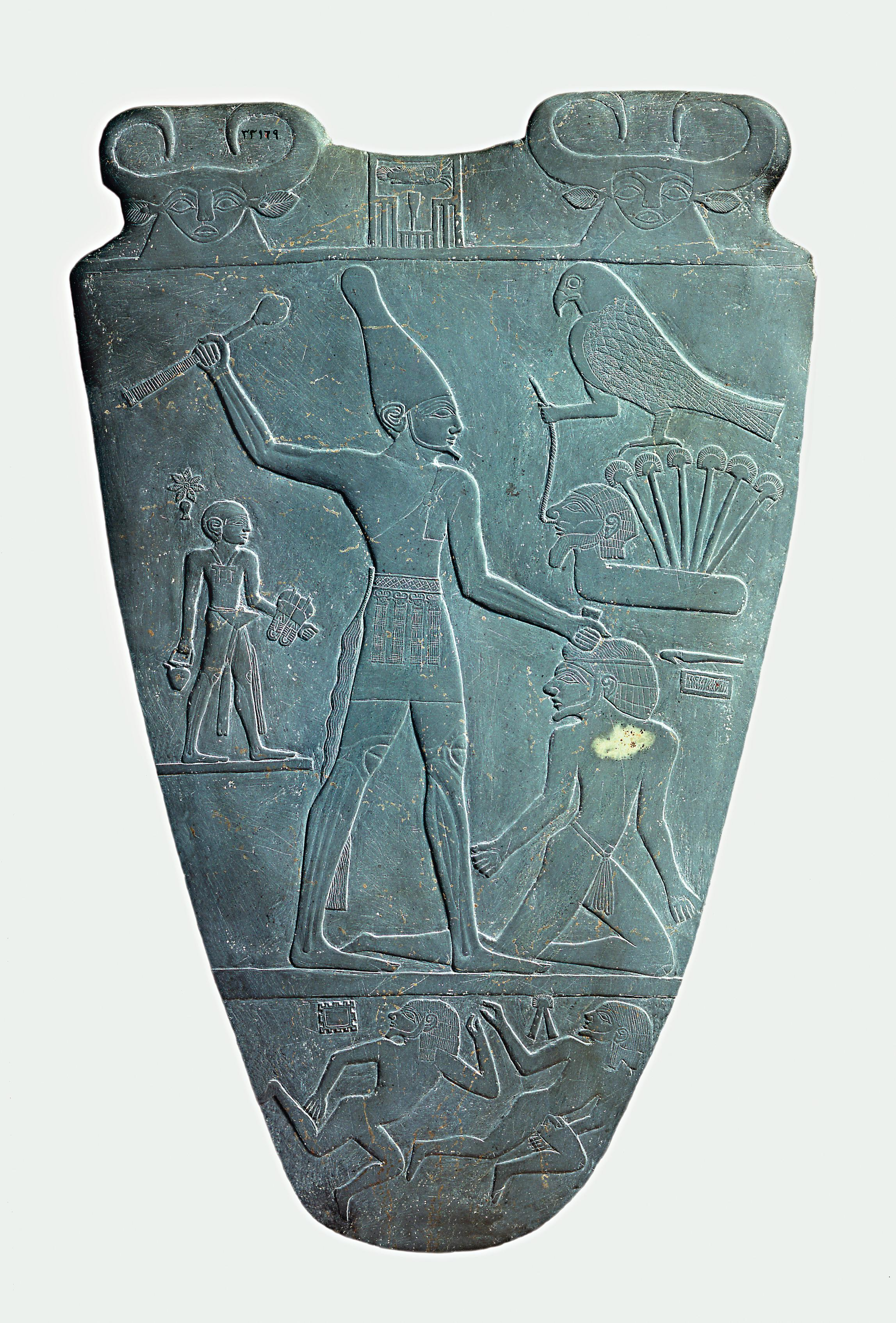
Name	Dimensions	Image	Location	Notes + Topic
Battlefield Palette; Vultures Palette, etc.	Full Height? 50 x 32 cm-(?) (20 x 13 in)		British Museum	Side A: war; Side B: peace ('Order vs Chaos')
Bull Palette	–		Louvre
Gerzeh Palette	–	Gerzeh palette	Egyptian Museum, Cairo
Hunters Palette	30.5 x 15 cm (12 x 6 in)		British Museum	(smaller fragment in Louvre)
Libyan Palette	(original, approximated: 70 x 25 cm) (ht x width)		Egyptian Museum, Cairo	(surviving dimensions: ~18.5 x ~21 cm, (7 x 8 in)) (ht x width)
Min Palette; El Amrah Palette	–
Narmer Palette; Great Hierakonpolis Palette	64 x 42 cm (25 x 17 in)		Egyptian Museum in Cairo	Unification of Southern Egypt, Delta Egypt, (Upper and Lower Egypt)

== Shield-shape palettes ==
A list of shield-shaped palettes; the majority are vertically oriented. (The Hunters Palette is an example of a horizontally-oriented palette.)

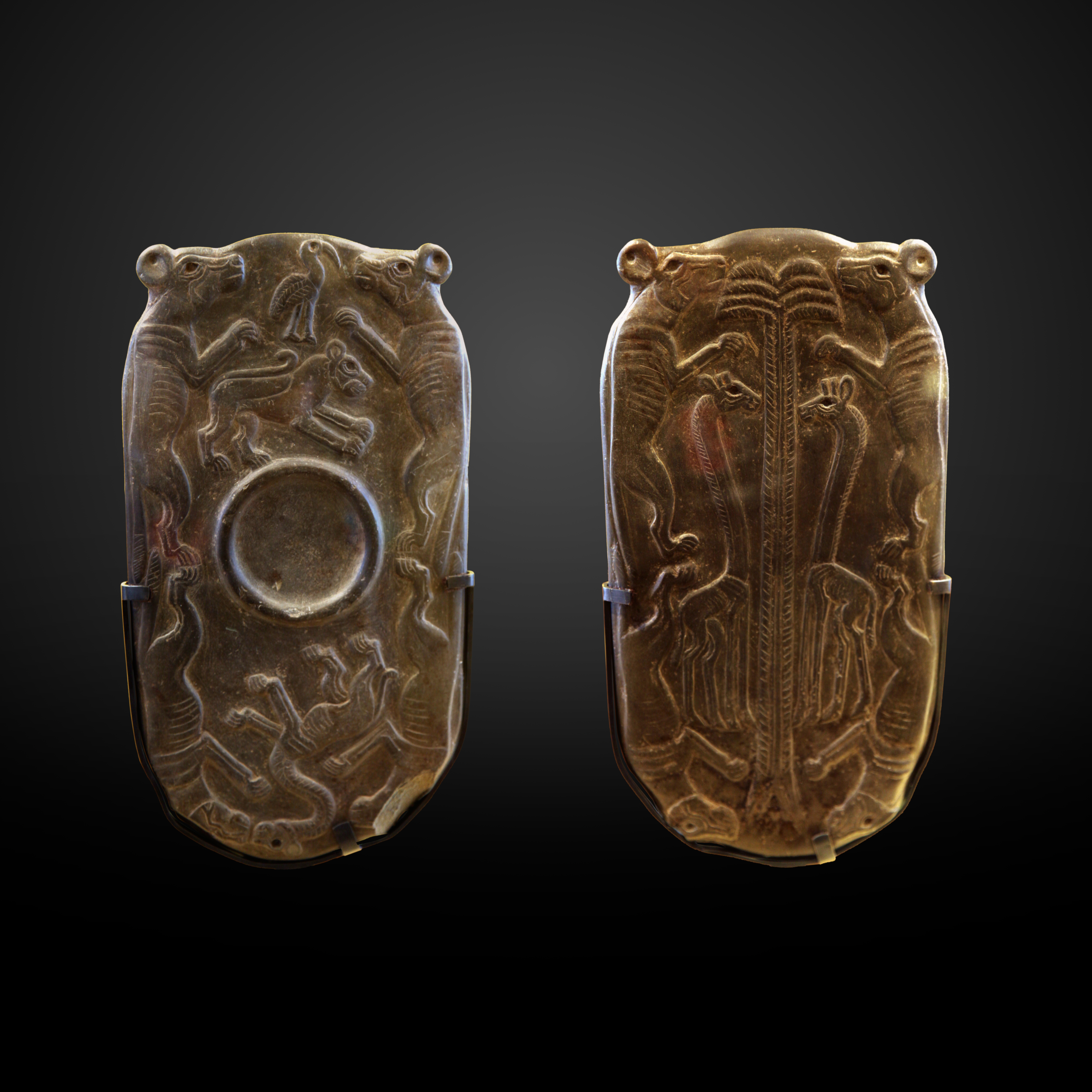
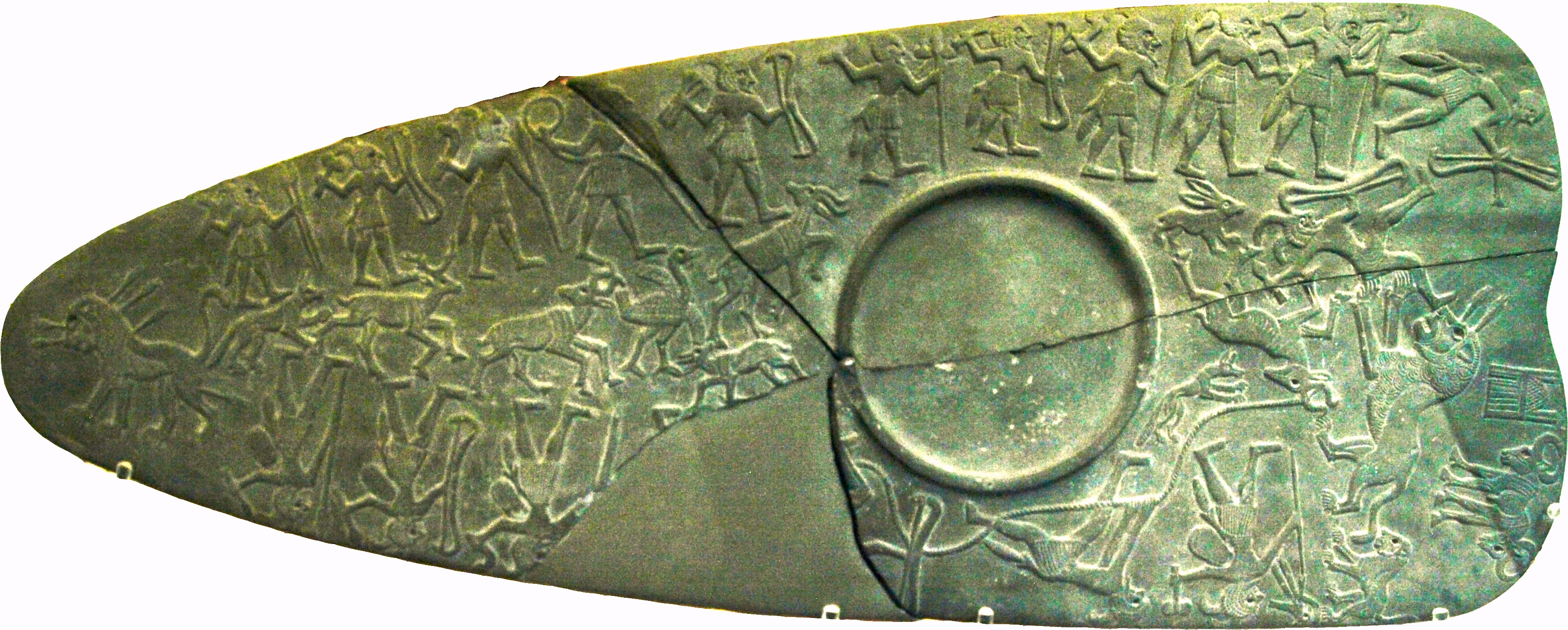
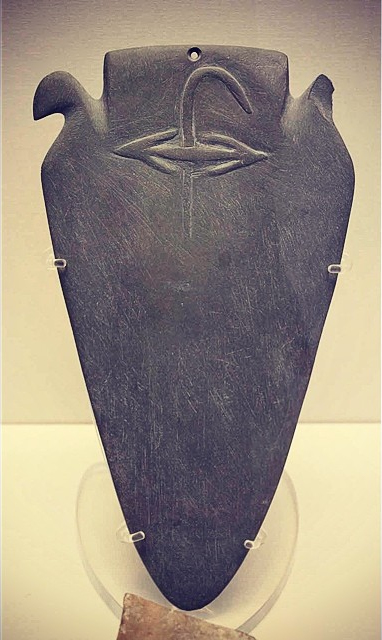
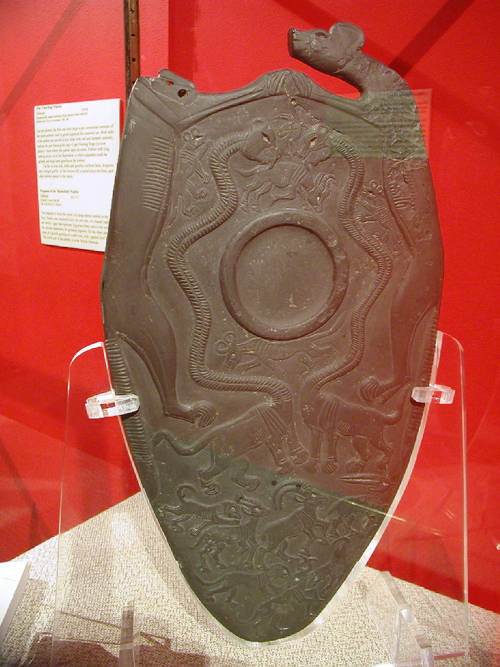
Name	Dimensions	Image	Location	<--> Form	Notes + Topic
"Two-bird heads palette (Brooklyn)"	22.5 x 11.8 cm (8.8 x 4.6 in)		Brooklyn Museum, USA	V38	Unadorned palette, Shield-shaped, with 2-opposed-Bird-Heads
Four Dogs Palette; Giraffes Palette; Louvre Palette	–		Louvre	V38	Obverse:Four canines and other animals, w/cosmetic circle
"Duck, trussed" Trussed-Goose Palette-G54	–		British Museum	V38
Hunters Palette	(horizontally– –oriented); 30.5 x 15 cm (12 x 6 in)		British Museum	N20	(smaller fragment in Louvre)
Manshiyet el Ezzat Palette	(Broken top); 23.5 to 27 x 12 cm, (9-10 x 5 in) (ht x width)			V38	Discovered in a tomb, dated to Pharaoh Den's reign Cosmetic Circle: two confronted lions with intertwined necks, (as on the Narmer Palette).
Min Palette; El Amrah Palette	–			V38	The only adornment is a "typographic ligature" style combination of the archaic "Min symbol"–R23 with the hieroglyph for "crook-staff"–S39 (1/4 of palette face)
Narmer Palette; Great Hierakonpolis Palette	64 x 42 cm (25 x 17 in)		Egyptian Museum, Cairo	V38	Unification of Southern Egypt, Delta Egypt, (Upper and Lower Egypt)
Oxford Palette; Minor Hierakonpolis Dogs Palette "Ashmolean Palette" "Two Dog Palette"	42 x 22 cm (17 x 9 in)		Ashmolean Museum, no. E3294	V38	greywacke, ca. 3150 BC two serpopards, necks framing a mixing circle, and necks in wave-motion-(3-cycles); both serpopards are licking a gazelle, (as a newborn, or young)

== Zoomorphic palettes ==
A list of zoomorphic, or animal style Egyptian palettes.

Name	Dimensions	Location	Notes + Topic
"Anchor Palette" ("Double Bird (Pelta) Palette")	–	Pelta?	Anchor-shaped, double outward facing bird-heads
Bird (Louvre) (a goose)	–	Louvre	Naqada IId-IIIc
"El Ahaiwah Dog Palette"	–		from El Ahaiwah- (El Ahaiwah)
"Duck, trussed" Trussed-Goose Palette-G54	–	British Museum	portrayed later in hieroglyphs as G54, a 'trussed goose'
Elephant palette	(length-(horizontal): ~20.5 cm, (~8 in)	Egyptian Museum, Berlin
Geese Palette	(broken palette); 14.5 x 11.5 cm (6 x 5 in)	British Museum, 32074	schist remainder piece has large, entire cosmetic circle, 2 small confronted geese below
Barbary Goat palette	–	British Museum
Turtle Palette {circular)	–	Louvre	Circular shape with small turtle appendages
Turtle Palette no. 2 {circular)	–	Egyptian Museum, Berlin	Circular shape with small turtle appendages

== Bird palettes ==
Name	Dimensions	Location	<--> Form	Notes + Topic
Bird (Louvre) (a goose)	–	Louvre	G42	Naqada IId-IIIc goose, seated-(at rest)
"Duck, trussed" Trussed-Goose; Palette-G54	–	British Museum	V38; G54
"Two-bird heads palette (Brooklyn)"	22.5 x 11.8 cm (8.8 x 4.6 in)	Brooklyn Museum, USA	V38; H1 H1	Unadorned palette, Shield-shaped, with 2-opposed-Bird-Heads
Guinea Fowl Palette	28.5 x 19 cm (11.3 x 7.5 in)	Brooklyn Museum, USA	?	Guinea Fowl shape, Naqada II, (with small inlaid white eye)

== Miscellaneous palettes, fragments ==
Name	Dimensions	Location	<--> Form	Notes + Topic
Min Antelope Palette	–		N33	(Naqada IId-IIIc) circular with suspension hole, inscribed with antelope, 1/3 of face
"Ka Palette (no. 1)"	–	?	Q3	D28, Ka hieroglyph-shaped plate large vertical offering-style plate (see the Hotep-style plates, and the Ancient Egyptian offering formula)
"Ka Palette (no. 2)"	–	?	Q3	D28, Ka hieroglyph-shaped plate plus Ankh, Papyrus, and U3S-staff S34, M13, S40

== Egyptian hieroglyphs and the palette's corpus ==
A list of the Egyptian hieroglyphs and the individual palettes.

=== Gerzeh Palette ===
The Gerzeh Palette, or "Hathor Palette", "Cow-Head Palette" has topics containing 5-stars, a pair of horns, and a stylized "head". The hieroglyphs are:

N14

,

F13

, and possibly a relation to

Y8

, Hathor-sistrum, (the shape of the cow's head, as on the Narmer Palette), and

R20

.

=== Min Palette ===
The only adornment is a "typographic ligature" style combination of the archaic "Min symbol"--

R23

with the hieroglyph for "crook-staff"--

S39

(1/4 of palette face).

== Galleries ==
=== Zoomorphic gallery ===
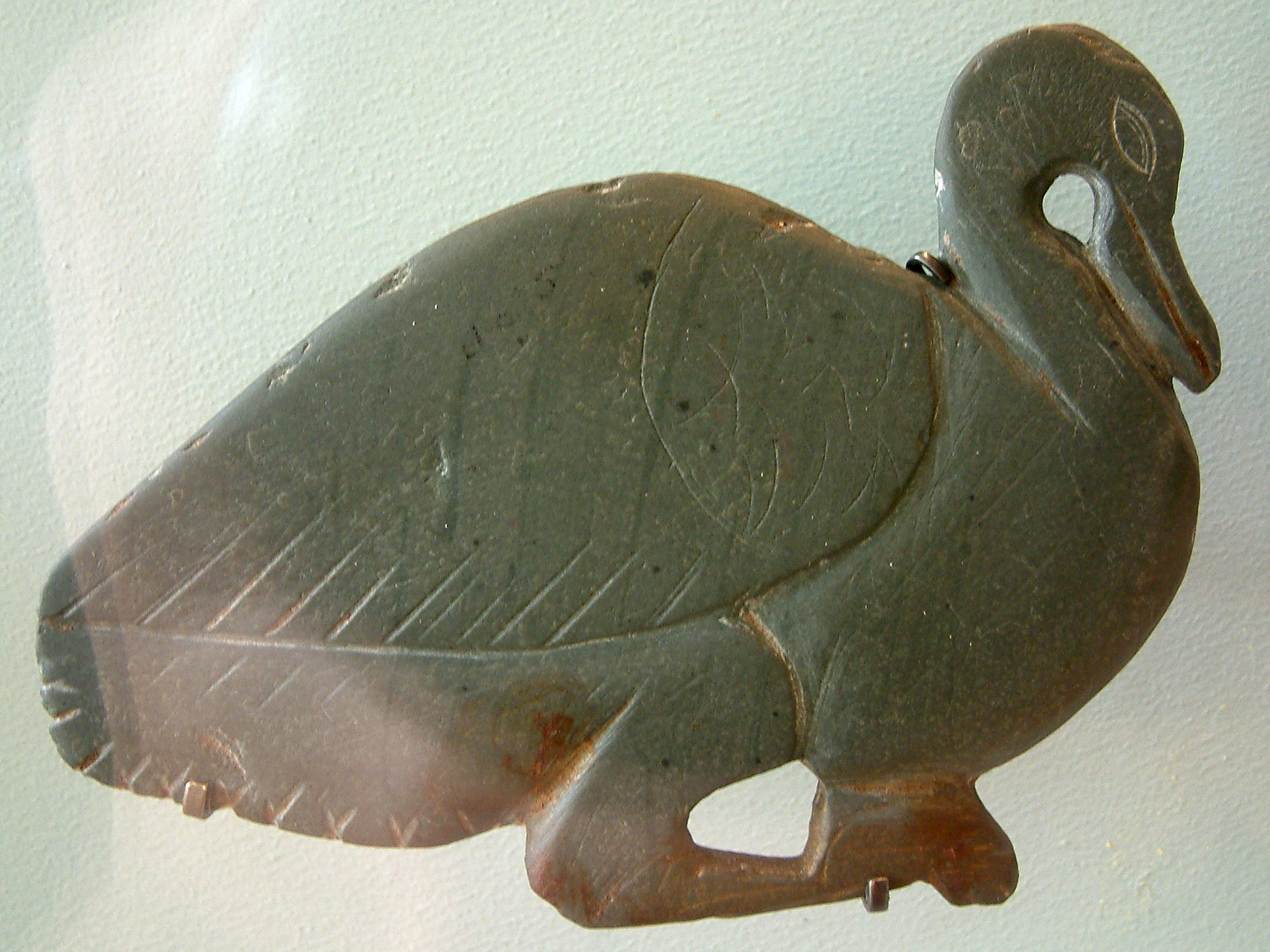
Bird - (non-typical, sitting Goose-(duck))

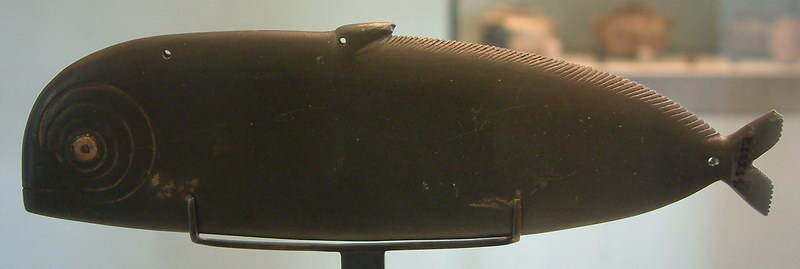
Fish-(Dolphin-shape)

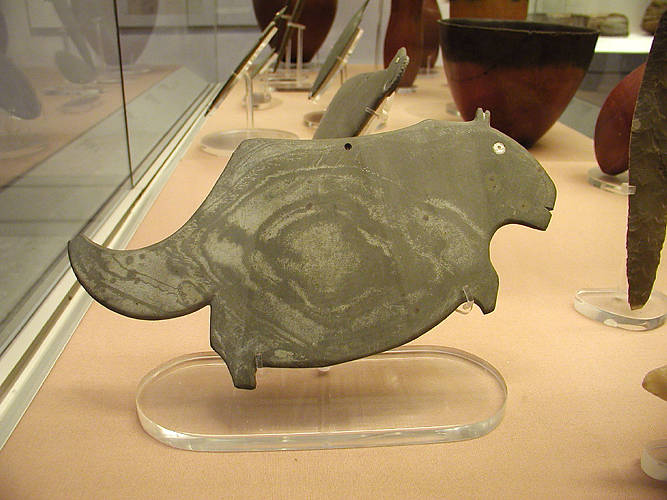
Hippopotamus

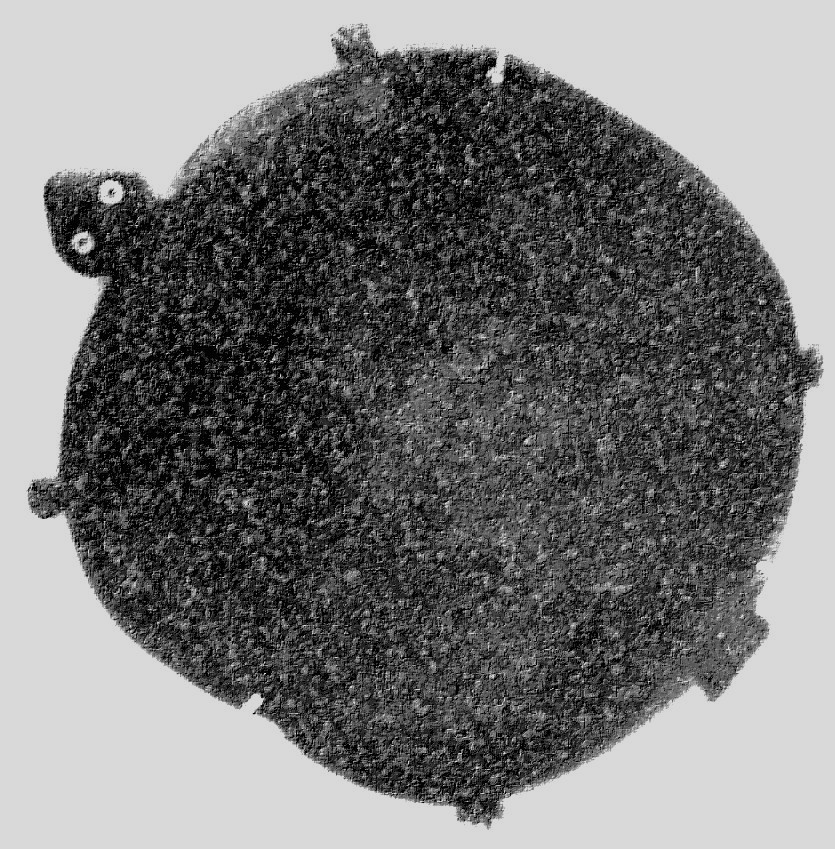
Turtle

=== Miscellaneous pallettes ===
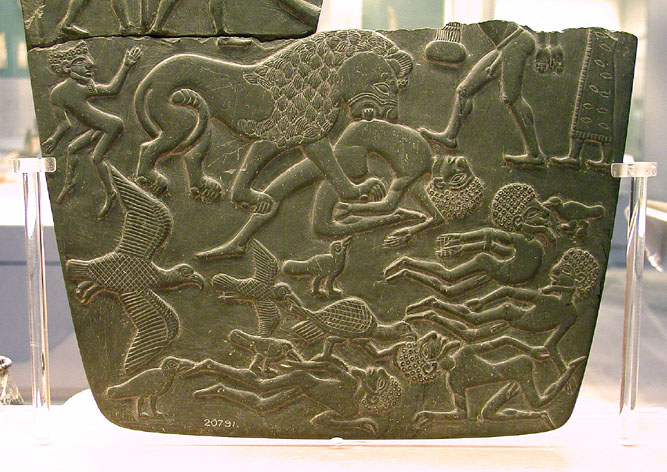
Battlefield Palette

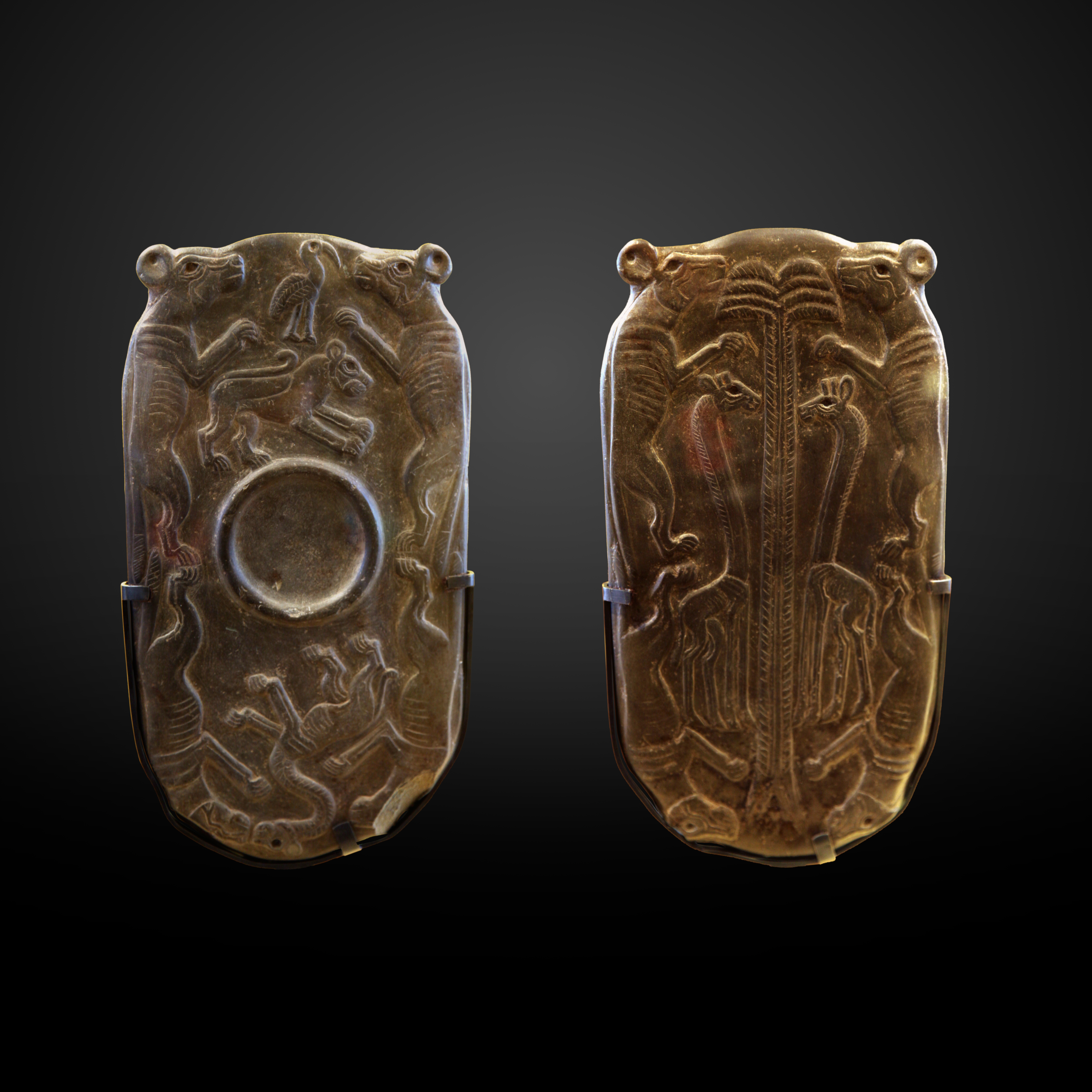
Four Dogs Palette

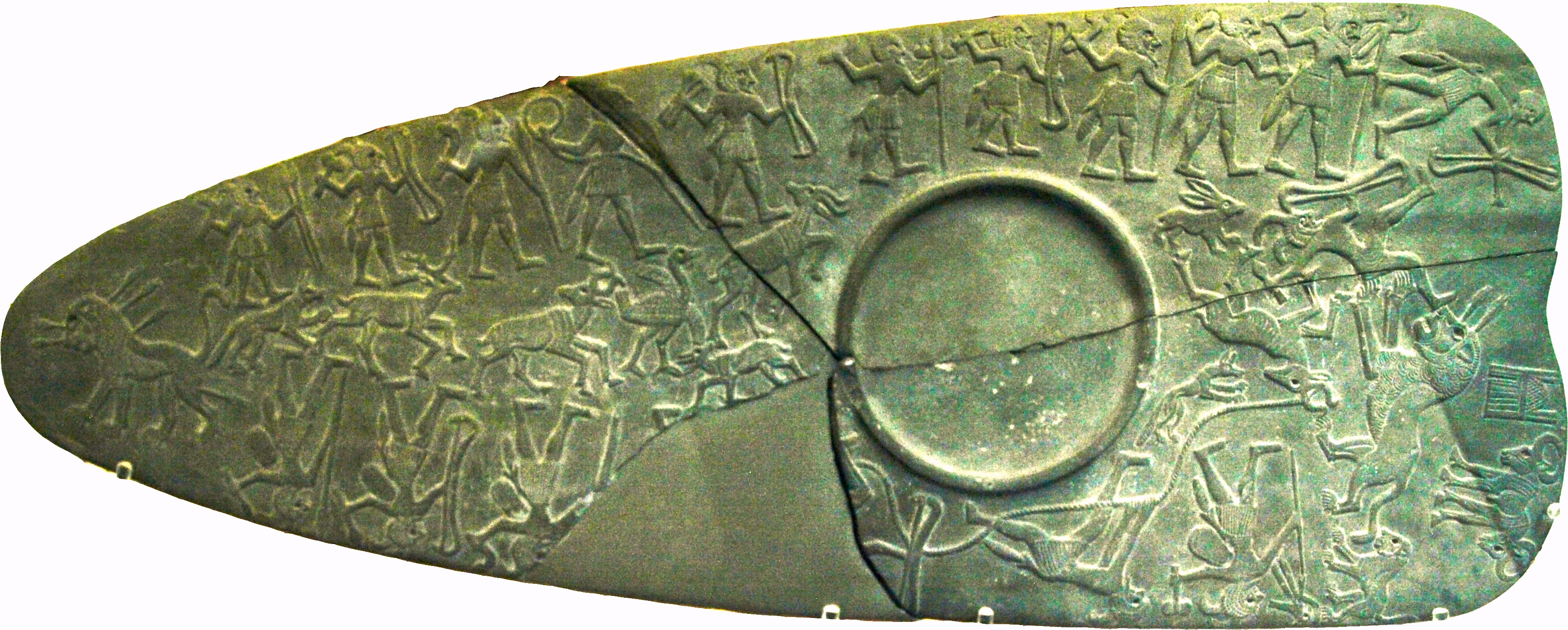
Hunters Palette

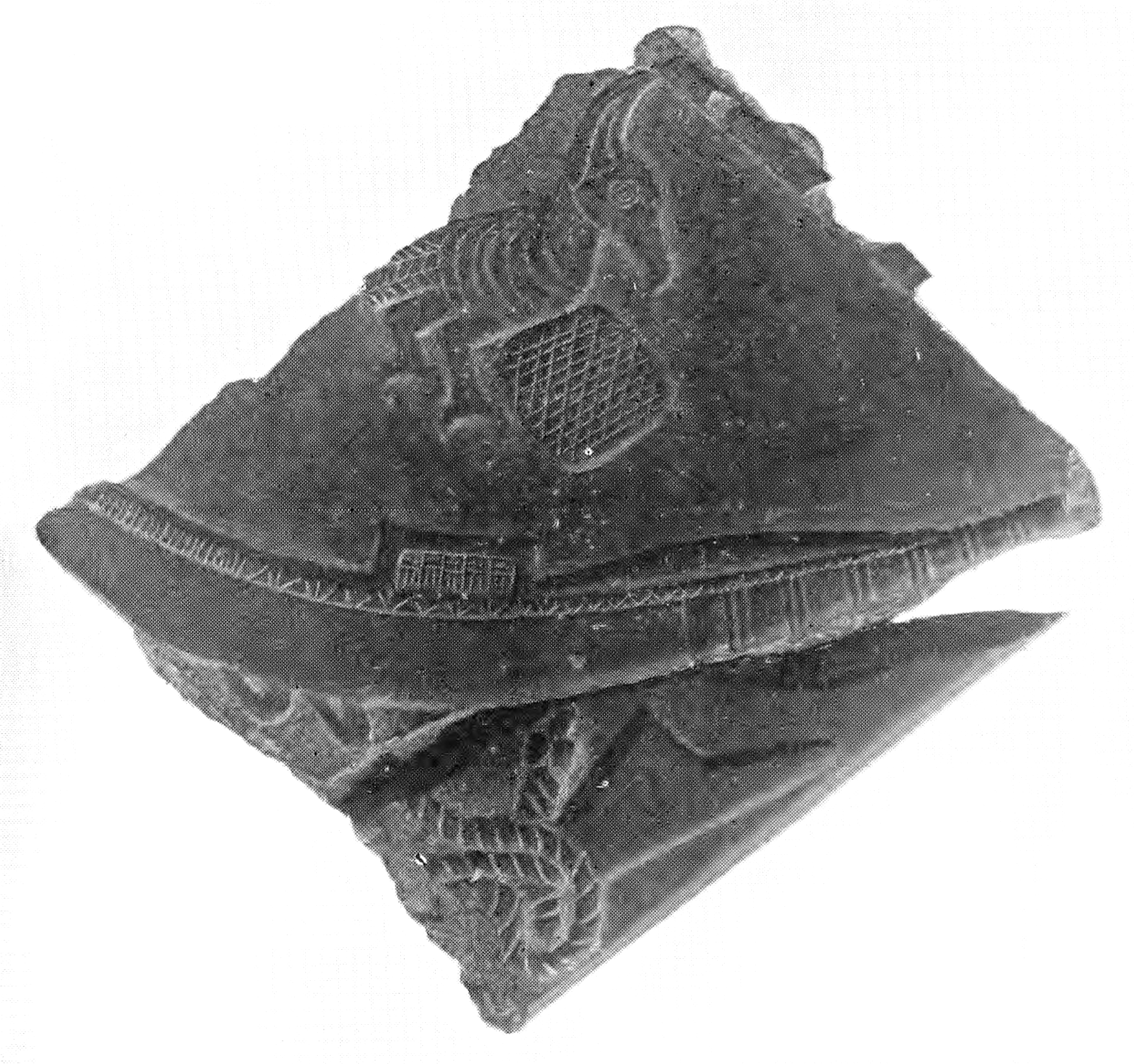
Plover palette

== See also ==
- Cosmetic palette
- Zoomorphic palette
- Gardiner's Sign List
