= Manshiyat Ezzat Palette =

Predynastic Egyptian cosmetic palette

The Manshiyat Ezzat Palette is an ornately adorned schist cosmetic palette from predynastic Egypt found at a cemetery in the eastern Delta town of Manshiyat Ezzat, Dakahlia Governorate. The gravesite is from Pharaoh Den's reign, First Dynasty of Egypt. The palette is of low to moderate bas relief. (see diagram and photo: photo graphic: )

The ornamental palette contains the cosmetic eyepaint mixing circle, with the circle made up of the necks of two confronted lions; the lions are identical to the serpopard-lion motif as found on the Narmer Palette and is conjectured to refer to the uniting of Delta Egypt with Southern Egypt.

== Description ==
The Manshiyat Ezzat Palette is a shield-shaped palette as found in the Naqada II period-(Amratian). The palette face contains a gazelle bordering the upper left edge; a palm tree borders the upper right. Animals adorn the bottom center and left, with the gazelle being chased.

The palette is asymmetric since the gazelle on the upper left adorns the palette's top-center with its extended neck; the gazelle's upper neck and head are missing, with the height of the palette about 23.5 cm (9 in), and with the head complete, maybe 27 to 30 cm. The palette is 12 cm (5 in) wide.

=== Mixing circle, serpopard motif ===
The center 1/3 of the ceremonial cosmetic palette consists of the motif of the eye paint mixing circle, and the circle is made-up of the two necks of confronted lions. Two other palettes have this serpopard motif, the Narmer Palette and the Oxford Palette (the Minor Hierakonpolis Palette), and they are conjectured to refer to initial uniting of Upper and Lower Egypt. Further artifacts from Pharaoh Den's reign may elucidate this time period of the 1st Dynasty.

== See also ==
- List of ancient Egyptian palettes
