= Crook-staff (Luwian hieroglyph) =

Anatolian hieroglyph

The Luwian hieroglyphs include a representation of a crook staff, by convention named lituus (Latin for "crooked staff"). It is encoded as Unicode U+145AB (𔖫, ANATOLIAN HIEROGLYPH A378).

It is comparable to the crook-staff hieroglyph or heqa-sceptre (Gardiner's list S38, S39) used in Egypt.

== See also ==
- Anatolian hieroglyphs
