= Libyan Palette =

Ancient Egyptian palette

Libyan Palette

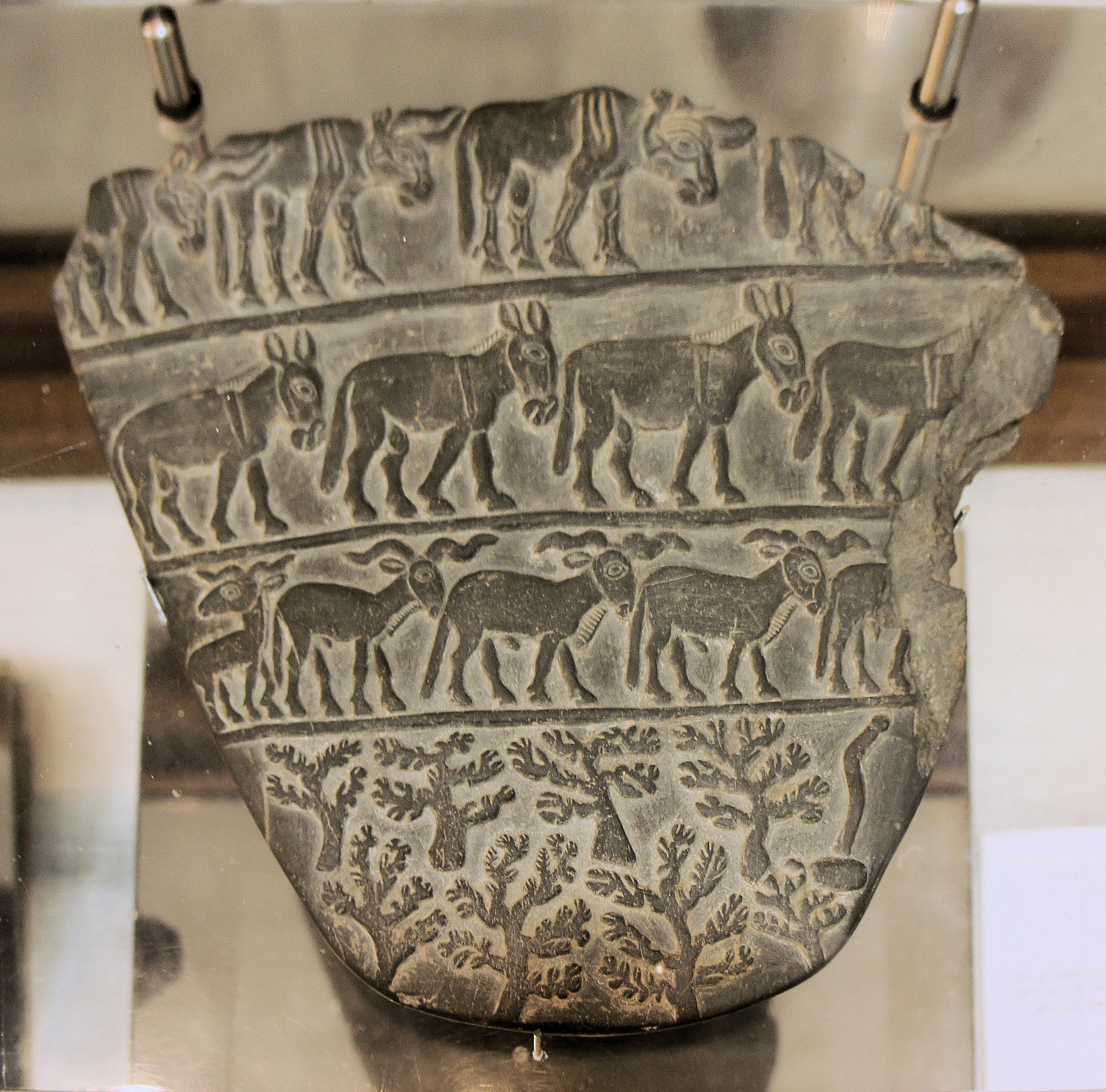
Front of the palette.

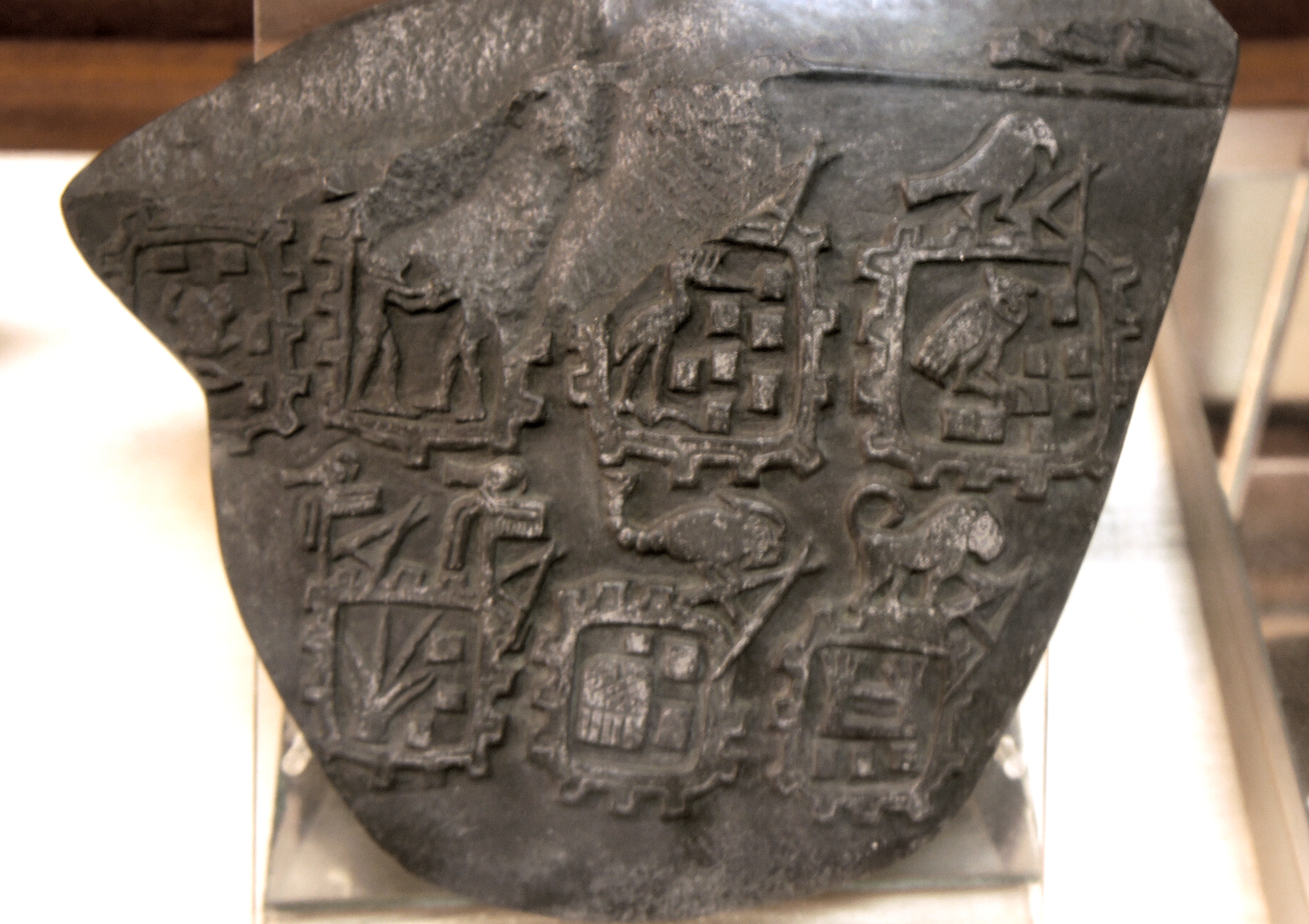
Back of the palette.

The Libyan Palette (also variously known as the City Palette, the Libyan Booty Palette, the Libyan Tribute Palette, the Siege Palette, the Tehenu- or Tjehenu Palette) is the surviving lower portion of a stone cosmetic palette bearing carved decoration and hieroglyphic writing. It dates from the Naqada III or Protodynastic Period of Egypt (c. 3200 to 3000 BC). The palette was found at Abydos, Egypt.

The palette is made of schist and it is 19 cm long and 22 cm wide. Housed in Room 43 on the ground floor of the Egyptian Museum, Cairo, its Journal d'Entrée number is JE27434 and its Catalogue Général number is CG14238.

== Content ==
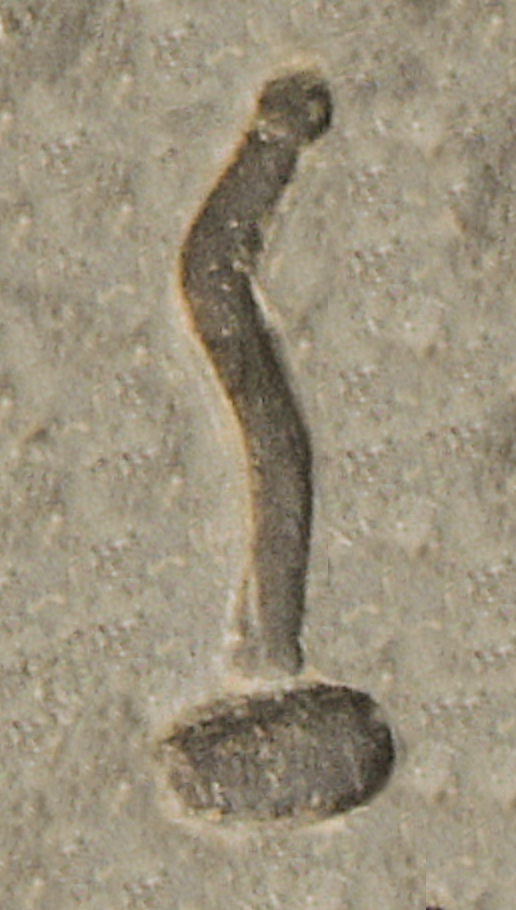
Early character for "Libya" on the Libyan Palette

On one side, there is a scene of walking lines of animals within registers. Below these animals, an orchard with olive trees is depicted, and the hieroglyphic inscription thnw or tjehenw (usually transcribed as tehenu), most likely a toponym of Western Nile Delta or, according to most scholars, what was later associated with Libya. The character consists of a throwing stick on top of an oval, meaning "region", "place", "island", a toponym of Libya or Western Delta pronounced THnw, Tjehenw.

The opposite side of the Libyan Palette shows the feet of some persons above a register line. Under the register, seven fortified towns are depicted, with the name of each town written within the wall. Above each town, an animal grasps its wall with the mr (hoe) hieroglyph. Günter Dreyer has interpreted this scene as a scene of destruction and the animals, or animal standards, as royal names. However, other scholars have suggested that the animals represent royal armies or symbols. Another completely different interpretation is that the scene represents the foundation of these cities.

== See also ==
- List of ancient Egyptian palettes
- Cosmetic palette

== Sources ==
- Abeer El-Shahawy. The Egyptian Museum in Cairo, (American University in Cairo Press 2005), ISBN 977-17-2183-6
- Lloyd, Alan B. A Companion to Ancient Egypt, vol.1, (Blackwell 2010), ISBN 1-4443-2006-8
- Seidlmayer, Stephan. Egypt: The World of the Phaaohs, Editors: Regine Schulz, Matthias Seidel, (Könemann, 1998), ISBN 3-89508-913-3
- Wilkinson, Toby. Early Dynastic Egypt, (Routledge, 1999), ISBN 0-415-18633-1
