= James O. Mills =

James Olan Mills, also known as Jay Mills, is an American archaeologist primarily known for his work in paleopathology and the excavations at Nekhen (Hierakonpolis), the capital of Upper Egypt in the late 4th millennium BC, ancient Egypt's Protodynastic Period.

== Life ==
Mills received his BA from Vanderbilt University in 1984. He was a professor with the Department of Anthropology at the University of Florida, with a particular focus on Egyptology, paleopathology, and the importance of beer and bread in ancient Egyptian culture and health.

He served as codirector of the Egyptian Studies Association at the University of South Carolina and worked with its excavations in Nekhen, participating under Michael Hoffman in 1985–6 and directing them in 1987–8 and the early 1990s with Walter Fairservis, and returning in the late 1990s under Barbara Adams and Renée Friedman. In 1986, together with Ahmed Irawy Radwan, he discovered and studied a petroglyph which possibly preserves a predynastic record of the solstices which influenced the development of the 365-day Egyptian civil calendar.

He also assisted with the archaeological survey during the establishment of Old Santee Canal Park near Charleston, South Carolina.

== Works ==
- An Archaeological Reconnaissance Survey of the Proposed Santee Canal Sanctuary, Berkeley County, South Carolina, Research Manuscript Series, No. 202, Columbia: South Carolina Institute of Archaeology and Anthropology, 1986 (with Tommy Charles).
- "Mapping Hierakonpolis", Nekhen News (PDF), Columbia: University of South Carolina, 1988, pp. 6–7.
- Astronomy at Hierakonpolis, American Philosophical Society, 1990, ISBN 9780871692146.
- "Antibiotics Produced through Grain Storage Practices: Recognition and Implications for the Egyptian Predynastic", The Followers of Horus, Egyptian Studies Association, No. 2, Oxbow Monograph, No. 20, Oxbow Books, 1992, pp. 28–35.
- "Paleopathology as Science: The Contribution to Egyptology", Biological Anthropology and the Study of Ancient Egypt, London: British Museum Press, 1993, pp. 1–18 (with George J. Armelagos).
- "Problems of Assessing Environmental Impact on the Predynastic Settlements of Hierakonpolis", Environmental Change and Human Culture in the Nile Basin and Northern Africa until the Second Millennium BC, Poznan: Poznan Archaeological Museum, 1993, pp. 359–370.
- "Paleopathology", Encyclopedia of the Archaeology of Ancient Egypt, Abingdon: Routledge, 1999 (with George J. Armelagos).
