= Sedjemnetjeru =

Ancient Egyptian artist

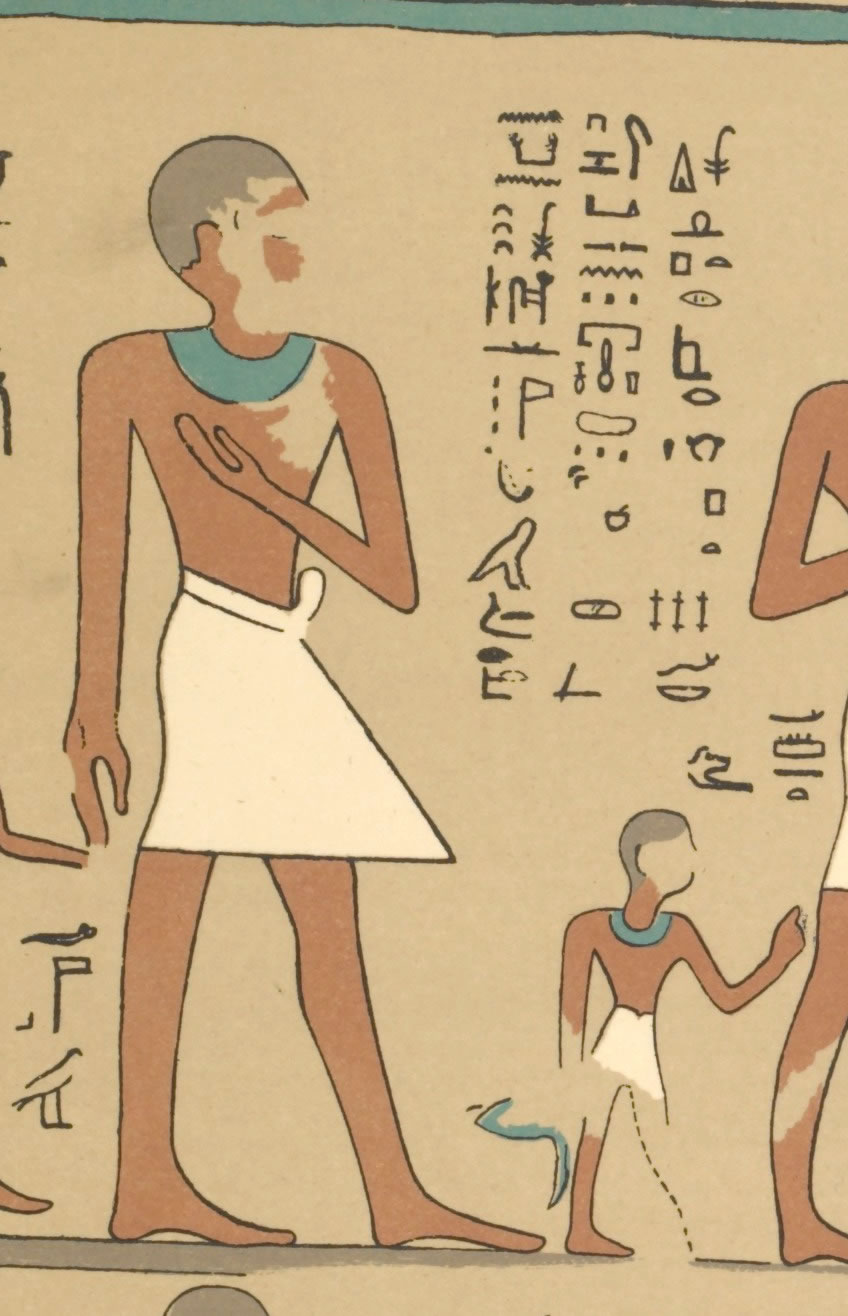
The artist Sedjemnetjeru as shown in the tomb of Sobeknakht (II)

Sedjemnetjeru was an ancient Egyptian artist who worked and lived in the Second Intermediate Period (about 1650 BC) in Elkab and Nekhen. He is one of the very few Ancient Egyptian artists who is known from several inscriptions and whose work is also known.

== Tomb of Horemkhauef ==
Sedjemnetjeru is depicted in the tomb of Horemkhauef where he bears the titles draughtsman and great one of the tens of Upper Egypt. The first title shows that he was an artist and it seems most likely that he painted the decoration in the tomb of Horemkhauef.

== Tomb of Sobeknakht II ==
Sedjemnetjeru is also mentioned in the tomb of the local governor Sobeknakht II and it seems likely that he painted this tomb too. Here he is shown in the procession behind the tomb owner's catafalque. Here he bears again the titles great one of the tens of Upper Egypt and draughtsman.

== Tomb of Hormin ==
Finally, Sedjemnetjeru is also mentioned in the tomb of a certain Hormin, that he most likely decorated too.

== External link ==
- Sedjemnetjeru on Persons and Names of the Middle Kingdom
