= Horemkhauef =

Ancient Egyptian priest

Horemkhaeuf
- Priest of Nekhen
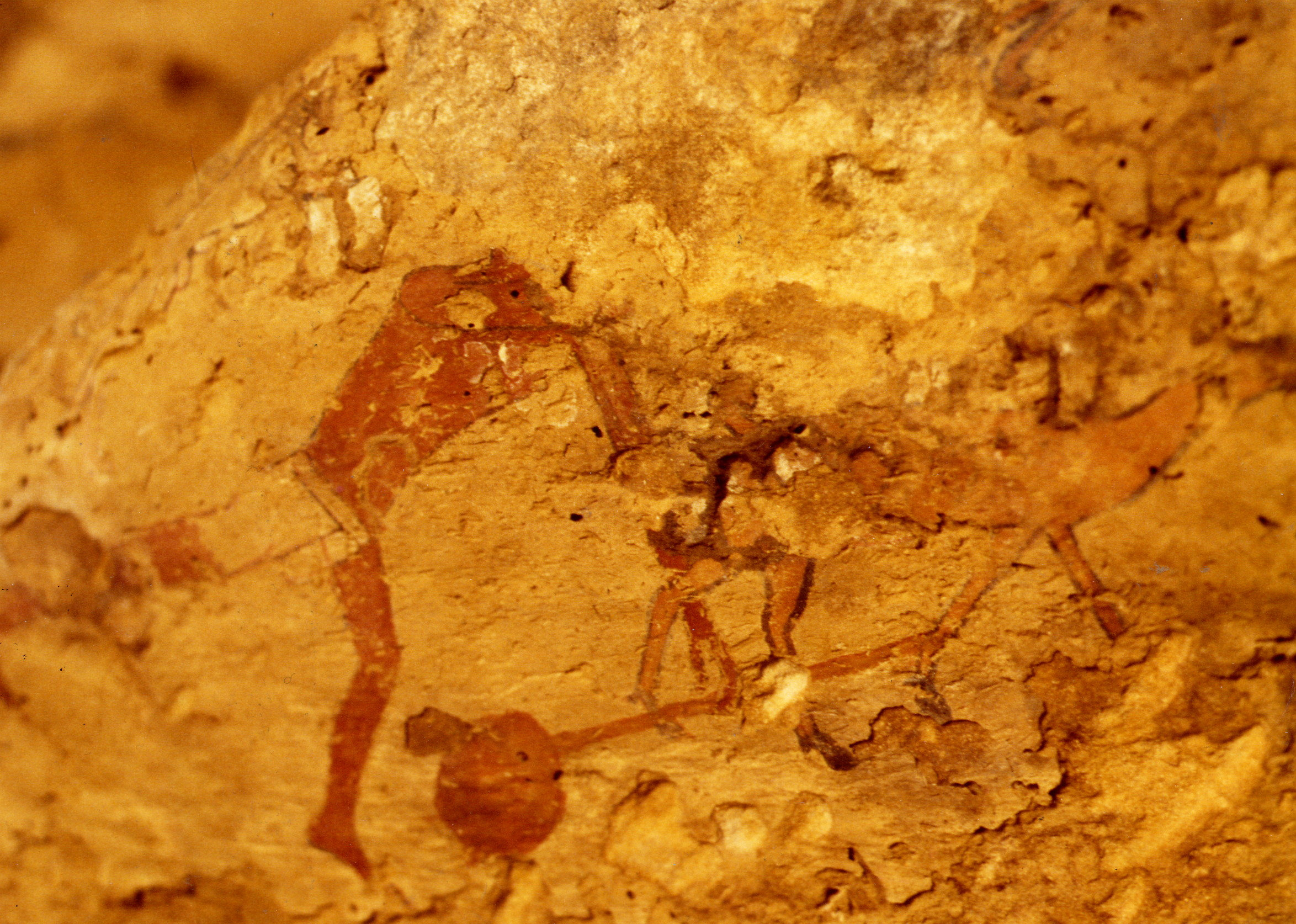
- A hunt, painting in the tomb of Horemkhaef
- Burial: Nekhen
- Father: Thuty (Inspector of Priests, Overseer of Fields)
- Mother: Tuetyeb (Royal Ornament)

Horemkhaef was an ancient Egyptian local official who lived in the Second Intermediate Period. He had the titles first inspector of priests of Horus from Nekhen and overseer of fields. Therefore, he was most likely the main priest at the local temple at Nekhen (known to the Greeks as Hierakonpolis), where Horus was worshipped.

Horemkhaef is known from his tomb at Nekhen. The rock-cut tomb is small, but is one of the few tombs of that period with a painted decoration in the chapel. In front of the chapel was a courtyard where a stela was found. The stela reports the journey of Horemkhaef to Itjtawy, the Middle Kingdom capital. There he received in front of the king, a new cult image of Horus and his mother, most likely Isis.

The tomb of Horemkhaef is small, but has the unusual painted decoration. The draughtsman Sedjemnetjeru, who most likely was the artist responsible for decorating the chapel, is depicted in the tomb.

== Attestations ==
- Tomb of Horemkhauef
- Stela MMA 35.7.55
