= Overseer of fields =

High-ranking royal court official in Ancient Egypt

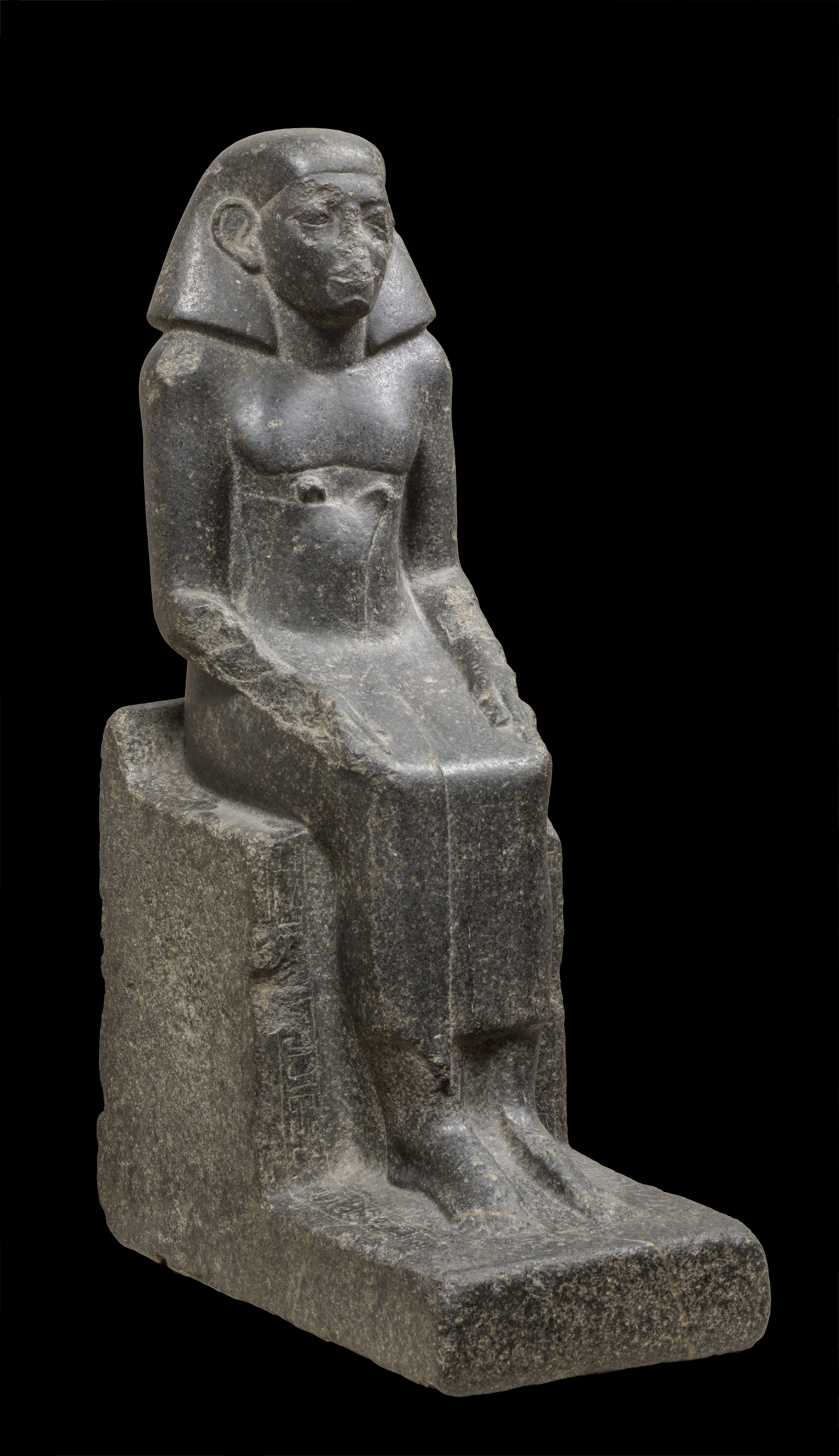
Statue of the overseer of fields Kheperka, granodiorite

The overseer of fields was one of the highest court officials at the Egyptian royal court. The title appears first in the provincial administration of the Old Kingdom and is attested in the First Intermediate Period at the royal court. In the early Middle Kingdom it is again best attested at provincial level. In the late Middle Kingdom they regularly bear the title royal sealer, indicating that they now belonged to the royal court. In the Middle Kingdom is also attested the scribe of the fields who evidently worked under the overseer of fields.

== Titleholders ==
- Ankhu (son of Merestekhi)
- Dedtu (dating to D13; P. Boulaq 18, reused blocks in the tomb of Seneb-kay)
- Horemkhauef, local priest, 13th Dynasty
