= Sandal-bearer =

Servant who bears the sandals of a superior

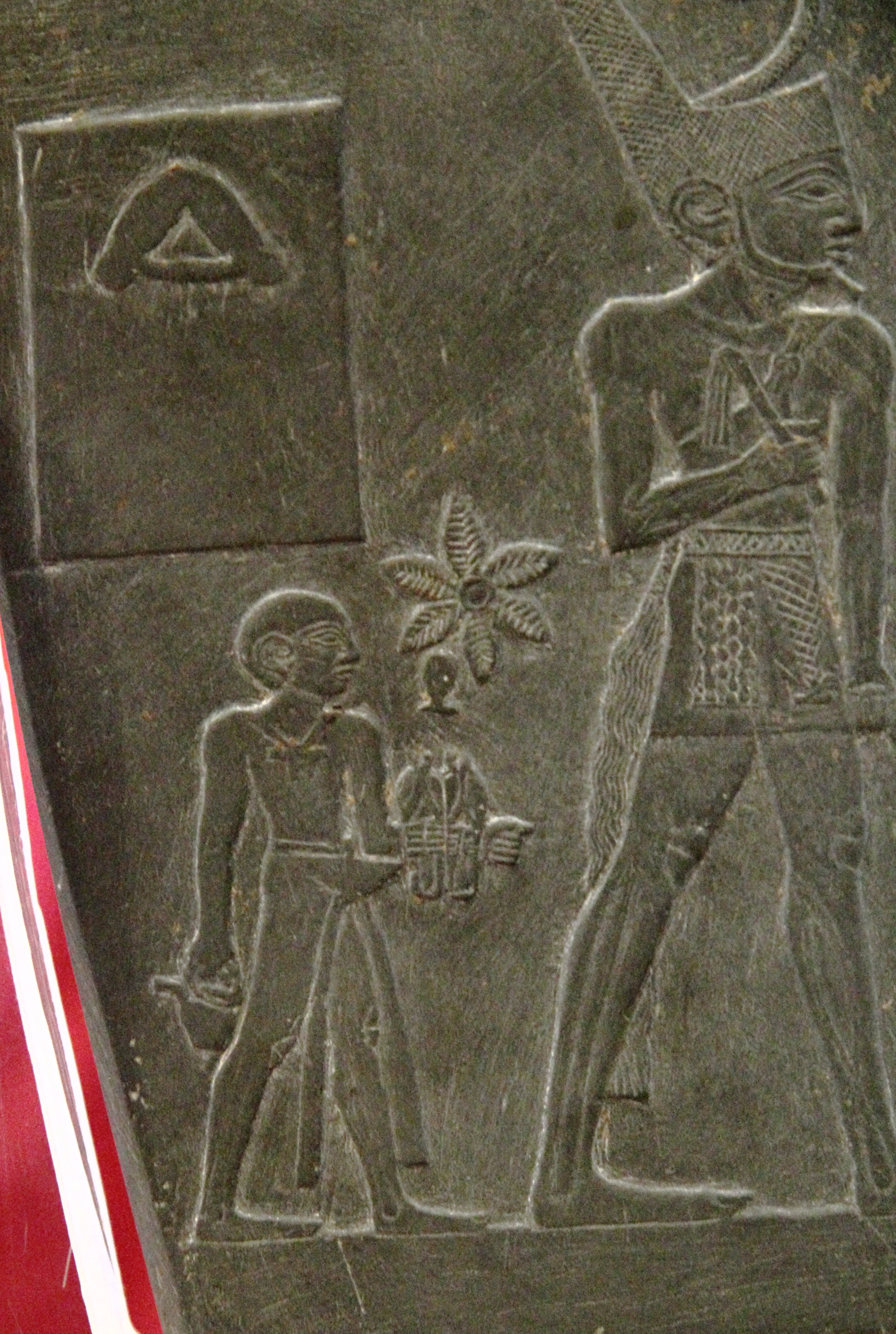
King Narmer (right) followed by his sandal-bearer. Detail from the Narmer Palette, Cairo Egyptian Museum.

A sandal-bearer is a person who bears the sandals of his superior. The role existed in various cultures and epochs.

== History ==
=== Bronze Age ===
The role of sandal-bearer was earliest documented in the Early Dynastic Period of ancient Egypt. A sandal-bearer is depicted on the Narmer Macehead, as well as on both sides of the Narmer Palette, in which he is identified in the hieroglyphs with a rosette and a club as the servant of the king. Based on interpretations of these depictions, the sandal-bearer was possibly a high-ranking official, accompanying the pharaoh on important occasions. In addition to carrying the sandals, the sandal-bearer would also perform the ancient practice of washing the king's feet.

=== Muromachi Japan ===
Sandal-bearers also existed in Feudal Japan, being a position of relatively high status. A prominent person known to take on this role was Toyotomi Hideyoshi, during the Sengoku period. Being of an Ashigaru-peasant origin, he joined the Oda clan around 1557, serving Oda Nobunaga as his personal servant. He became one of Nobunaga's sandal-bearers and was present at the Battle of Okehazama in 1560 when Nobunaga defeated Imagawa Yoshimoto to become one of the most powerful daimyos in the Sengoku period. After the death of Nobunaga, he secured a succession of high imperial court titles including, in 1585, the prestigious position of kanpaku (regent).
