= Barbara Adams (Egyptologist) =

British egyptologist

Barbara G. Adams
- Adams c. 1980
- Born: 19 February 1945; London, England
- Died: 26 June 2002 (aged 57); London Borough of Enfield, England
- Occupation: Egyptologist

Barbara Georgina Adams, FRSA (19 February 1945 – 26 June 2002) was a British Egyptologist, archaeologist, and academic, who was a specialist in Prehistoric Egypt. She worked for many years at Hierakonpolis, where she was the co-director of the expedition. She worked at the Petrie Museum of Egyptian Archaeology in London, latterly as curator (1984–2001), and also worked on excavations across Britain.

== Early career and the Petrie museum ==
Barbara Bishop was born in Hammersmith Hospital in London to Charles and Ellaline Bishop. Her parents had unskilled jobs but she gained a scholarship to Godolphin and Latymer School but her finances did not run to study after sixteen. After leaving school she continued to study at night-school. At seventeen, she became an apprentice at the natural history museum.

She worked and studied in her own time and in 1962, she became an assistant at the Natural History Museum. She specialised in entomology at the museum and she became an assistant of R.B. Benson. She transferred to Dr K.P. Oakley's anthropology department in 1964 where she became acquainted with tool-artefacts and gained a knowledge of human skeletal anatomy. In 1964 she won the Miss Hammersmith beauty contest and a book of her poetry Bones in my Soul was published.

Adams became a museum assistant at the Petrie Museum of Egyptian Archaeology, at University College London in 1965. Her employment with Professor Harry Smith, Edward Chair in Egyptian Archaeology of the University College, helped her career. She was promoted to assistant curator and academic staff in 1975, and made curator of the Petrie Museum in 1984. She would head the museum until her cancer diagnosis in 2001.

Her first practical experience in 1965 was an excavation in Yorkshire by the University of Leeds. Later the same year she assisted in cemetery digs in Winchester and elsewhere within England. Contacts with artifacts from the Romano-British site at Dragonby in Lincolnshire) in excavations of 1966 were followed by a seminal encounter in the same year with Hierakonpolis artefacts. In 1967 she married a civil servant named Rob Adams, moved to Enfield and also gained a distinction for her London University diploma in archaeology.

She travelled to Egypt during 1969 and studied field techniques for archaeology at the university of Cambridge. Her 1974 text on the subject of ancient Hierakonpolis showed the catalogued findings of James Quibell and Frederick W. Green and was complemented by a lauded explication of Green's field notes. She turned her literary attention intermittently in the proceeding years to archived documents held in museums of the United Kingdom. In Liverpool museum she was able to find unpublished material gathered by John Garstang. Over many years she documented his work in three publications, The Fort Cemetery At Hierakonpolis in 1984 and Ancient Nekhen in 1990 and 1995.

== Hierakonpolis and onward ==
Her work with Garstang's excavations paid off when she was chosen as the pottery and objects expert for Michael A. Hoffman's re-established excavations of Hierakonpolis in 1979–80. She assisted at a cemetery of a predynastic elite group and she worked on the site until 1986. She had worked as an assistant to Walter Fairservis in 1981 at Nekhen and again in 1984. After Hoffmann's death in 1990, Adams and Renée Friedman became co-directors of the Hierakonpolis excavation which continued until 1996. She has been credited with the discovery of previously unknown funeral-masks and a life-size statue. She was editor of the Shire Egyptology Series (numbering 25 books in total). Her final work was based upon vase fragments from a cemetery at Abydos.

Adams died from cancer in 2002.

== Honors ==
- 1994, '95, '96: Gertrude Caton-Thompson (q.v.) Egyptology Department grants, University College London
- 2000: Member of German Archaeological Institute
- January 2002: Honorary fellow of University College London

== Bibliography ==
- Barbara Adams, Excavations in the Locality 6 cemetery at Hierakonpolis: 1979 - 1985, Oxford: Archaeopress, 2000, ISBN 1-84171-099-7
- Barbara Adams, Ancient Nekhen - Garstang in the city of Hierakonpolis, New Malden: Shire Publications, 1990, ISBN 1-872561-03-9
- Barbara Adams, Predynastic Egypt, Aylesbury Shire Publications, 1988
- Barbara Adams, The Fort cemetery at Hierakonpolis: excavated by John Gerstang, London: KPI, 1987, ISBN 0-7103-0275-4
- Barbara Adams, Sculptured Pottery from Koptos in the Petrie Collection, Warminster: Aris & Phillips, 1986, ISBN 0-85668-389-2
- Barbara Adams, Egyptian Mummies, Aylesbury Shire Publications, ISBN 0-85263-944-9
