= Herbert Adams Gibbons =

American journalist (1880 - 1934)

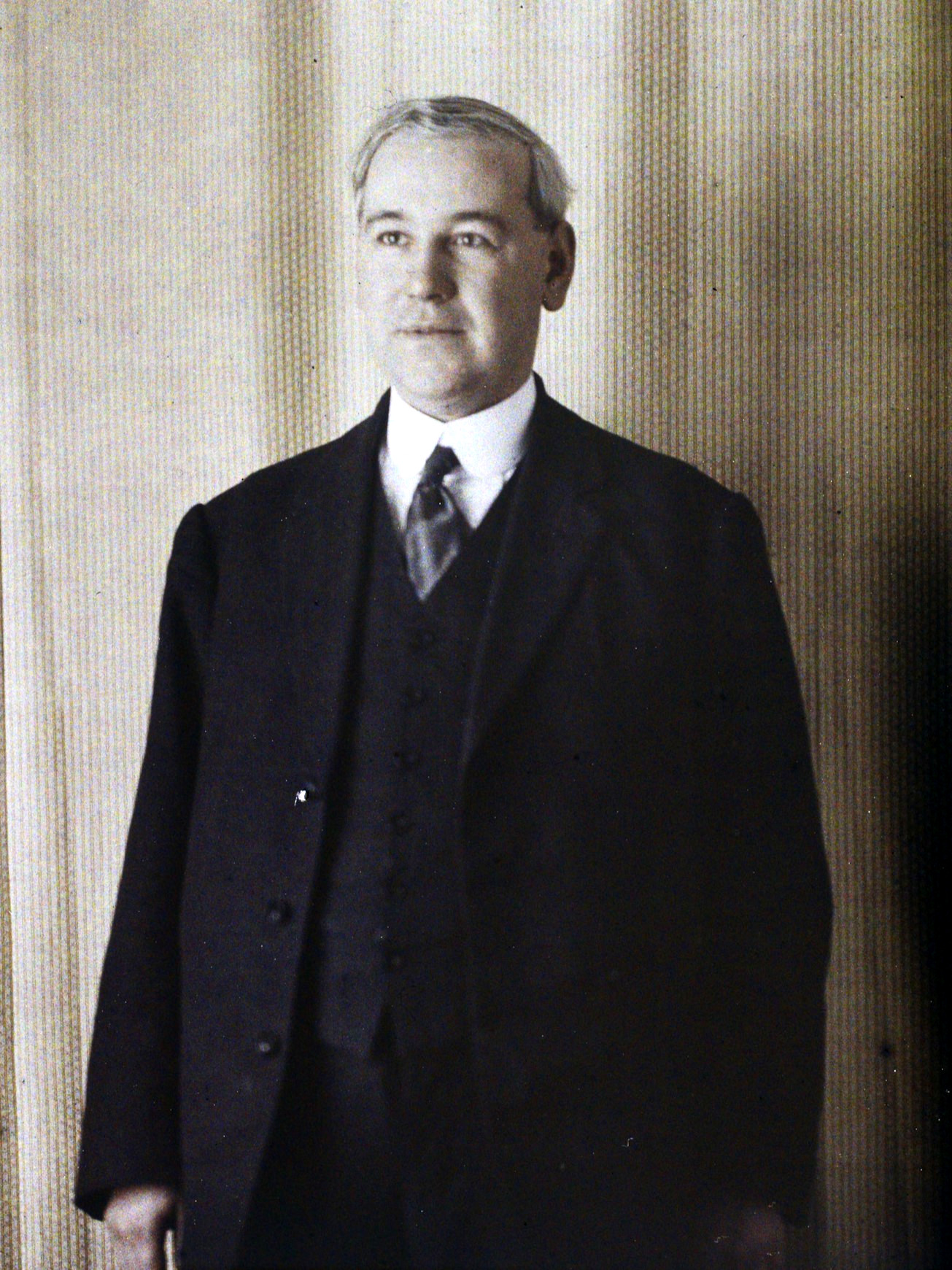
- Autochrome portrait by Auguste Léon, 1918
- Born: April 8, 1880; Annapolis, Maryland, U.S.
- Died: August 7, 1934 (aged 54); Grundlsee, Austria
- Occupation: journalist

Herbert Adams Gibbons (April 8, 1880 – August 7, 1934) was an American missionary and journalist who wrote about international politics and European colonialism during the early 20th century.

He is best known for his books, The New Map of Asia, The New Map of Africa, and The New Map of Europe. He is also known for his seminal study, The Foundation of the Ottoman Empire, which he wrote in Istanbul during the early 20th century.

Between 1908 and 1934, Gibbons was a foreign correspondent for several large New York newspapers. He was stationed in Greece, Spain, Turkey, Africa and China. His writings were syndicated in eighty newspapers in the United States.

Both Gibbons and his wife saw the effects of the pre-World War I Armenian genocide and Greek genocide events and are credited with saving many lives.

During the course of his career, Gibbons wrote more than two dozen books on international affairs and the shifting borders of the early 20th century. He lectured frequently about international politics, and was widely quoted in the media. Several of Gibbons' books are still in print today. He also wrote a comprehensive, two-volume biography of merchant-prince John Wanamaker.

== Career ==
Gibbons was born in Annapolis, Maryland. He attended the William Penn Charter School and the University of Pennsylvania in Philadelphia. In 1907 and 1913, he earned M.A. and Ph. D. degrees at Princeton University. In 1908, he received a Bachelor of Divinity degree from the Princeton Theological Seminary.

Gibbons initially visited Turkey as a missionary. He married author Helen Davenport Gibbons in 1908; she survived him and died in 1960.

Gibbons spent his early career in Turkey, which was then part of the Ottoman Empire. From 1908 to 1918, he was a correspondent for the New York Herald. During this period, he filed dispatches from Turkey, Egypt, the Balkan States, and France.

In April 1909, Gibbons and his wife, Helen, personally observed the Turkish attacks on Armenians, in what is today modern Turkey.

From 1910 to 1913, while he was in Turkey, Gibbons served as the Professor of History and Political Economy at Robert College in Istanbul.

Between 1917 and 1918, Gibbons served with the American Expeditionary Forces in France. During this time, he was still reporting for the New York Herald. In 1918, he wrote a book called Songs from the Trenches: The Soul of the A.E.F.

From 1918 to 1921, Gibbons was staff correspondent for Century Magazine.

Between 1920 and 1931, he was a correspondent for various American magazines, sending dispatches from Europe, Asia, and Africa. These publications included the Christian Science Monitor. While working at the Christian Science Monitor, Gibbons reported on the Greek genocide, in early 1922.

Gibbons lectured widely during the course of his career. Shortly after World War I, he became a professor in the History Department at Princeton University. He was also Honorary Associate Professor at the Army War College, in Washington, D.C. During the 1920s, he gave an annual series of lectures at the War College.

In 1930, the New York Times named Gibbons as its special correspondent in China and Manchuria.

In 1931, as part of a world tour, Gibbons was the first person to cross the continent of Africa, from the Indian Ocean to the Atlantic Ocean, by means of rail While in the Belgian Congo, Gibbons learned that a new rail line had just opened through Portuguese Angola. Gibbons was told that he was the first traveler to make the through trip. Gibbons made the complete trip across Africa – 3,500 miles – in nine days.

A political progressive in the mold of Woodrow Wilson, he was noted for his opposition to nativism and his belief in cultural assimilation for ethnic minorities, and for his concomitant opposition to Zionism, which he thought would lead to an increase in anti-Semitism.

Gibbons died on August 7, 1934, in Grundlsee, Austria, at the age of 54.

== Observation of Armenian genocide ==
Gibbons spent his early career in the Ottoman Empire and worked on his doctoral thesis and lectured at Robert College, in Istanbul. In 1909, as a missionary for the American Board of Foreign Missions, Gibbons and his wife, Helen Davenport Gibbons, witnessed the massacre of Armenians at Adana and Tarsus, located in modern-day Turkey.

The massacre was part of the Armenian genocide during which the Ottoman government systematically killed over 1.5 million Armenians.

In 1916 Gibbons wrote a book, The Blackest Page of Modern History: Events in Armenia in 1915, in which he described the massacres. In 1917, Gibbons' wife wrote a book, The Red Rugs of Tarsus, in which she too described her experiences during the massacres.

== Observation of Greek genocide ==
A few years later, Gibbons documented massacres involving the Greek population of Anatolia, in modern Turkey.

Gibbons described the massacres in a series of articles that he wrote for the Christian Science Monitor between May and July 1922. One article, dated May 24, 1922, described the massacre of the Greeks of Pontus, located along the Black Sea, in the northeast of modern Turkey. In the article, Gibbons compared the Ottomans' treatment of the Greeks to the earlier massacre of Armenians: "The massacres and deportations of the Greeks [are] more horrible even than those of the Armenians during the World War, and these crimes continue unabated." "Two years ago there were 25,000 Greeks here. Today, between the ages of 80 and 14, the male population numbers 6 priests and 10 civilians."

The massacres documented by Gibbons were part of the Greek genocide during which the Ottoman government systematically killed approximately 500,000 Greeks who lived in Anatolia. The remainder of the Greek population later fled the region.

== Views on World War I ==
Gibbons served as a foreign correspondent for several American publications during World War I.

He wrote about the war in his 1916 book, The New Map of Africa, while the war was still being fought. In the book, Gibbons correctly predicted that Germany would fight a second war to regain its colonial empire, if Germany lost the war. Gibbons concluded that a second war could be avoided if the Allies were to give Germany a reasonable amount of territory to colonize in Africa. If they did not, he accurately predicted that Germany would dominate Poland and the Balkans, which happened in the early days of the Second World War.

Following World War I, Gibbons opposed the Allies' efforts to blame Germany for the war. In a speech in New York in 1922, Gibbons explained that the war was caused by countries competing for trade interests. If Germany had not existed, the war would still have happened: "human nature," rather than "German nature," had caused the war.

== Views on colonialism ==
Gibbons had a conflicted attitude towards the colonial system, under which the European powers and the United States gained control over large portions of the globe in the late 19th century. When Gibbons was writing, the British Empire controlled 23% of the world's population and covered 24% of the Earth's total land area. The issue of colonialism was therefore of the utmost importance in international politics and world trade.

Early in his career, in 1919, Gibbons threw his support behind Woodrow Wilson's famous "Fourteen Points," which called for a League of Nations and self-determination for all people subject to colonial occupation. In his book, The New Map of Asia, written that year, Gibbons wrote the following about colonialism, which he called "European eminent domain":

When we examine analytically and weigh dispassionately arguments advanced for the maintenance of European eminent domain, we realize that they are based upon principles we have proscribed. They are the principles of Prussian militarists and of the German Imperial Government. For European eminent domain is the doctrine of the Uebermensch put into practice. Races, believing in their superiority, imposed by force their rule and Kultur upon inferior races. European eminent domain has no justification . . . . Can a man believe in the 'white mans burden' -- with all that this phrase implies -- and at the same time condemn what we fought Germany to destroy?

However, later in his career, Gibbons was reluctant to criticize the colonial system in some of his newspaper writing. For example, Gibbons opposed the United States giving the Philippines independence. He believed that doing so would undermine the international colonial system, and would threaten the position of the French in Indo China, the Dutch in the East Indies and the British in Malaysia. Gibbons also believed that an American withdrawal from the Philippines would threaten America's commercial interests in the Far East, because the United States would not have a convenient place to keep an army and navy in the area.

In the early 1930s, Gibbons argued that an American withdrawal from the Philippines would be futile because Japan would immediately colonize the country if the United States were to pull out. In 1931, in a speech in Manila, Gibbons referred to the Philippine calls for independence as "claptrap." He said that if the United States were to withdraw, it might as well negotiate with the League of Nations to hand the Philippines over to Japan as a mandate. The American business community roundly praised Gibbons' speech. However, Philippine nationalist leaders attacked Gibbons by saying that he was raising the "Japanese bogy" as a hurdle to Philippine independence. (Ultimately, the United States did not grant Philippine independence until 1946, after Japan was no longer a military threat to the former colony.)

Gibbons, also, had no objection to other countries engaging in colonialism for national gain. In the early 1930s, he defended the Japanese invasion of mainland China and found that Japan's actions were no different than American colonization of Mexico or European colonization of other parts of the world. Gibbons thought that Japan could bring peace and commercial order to China. In a front-page article for the New York Times, written in 1932, Gibbons expressed frustration with the constant warfare that characterized China in the 1920s. Gibbons felt that such warfare interfered with the United States' efforts to do business in China. He noted that Americans had to be evacuated from Nanking "seven or eight times" due to the civil war. Gibbons' preference was for Europe and the United States to bring peace to China. However, if such powers were unwilling or unable to do so, he was willing to allow the Japanese to impose order on the country.

Gibbons recognized the calls for independence that affected the colonial world during his time. In 1932, shortly before his death, Gibbons wrote in the New York Times, "There is vast unrest in the East. It affects directly more than half of the human race." Gibbons attributed this unrest to unfair economic policies imposed on the east by the European colonial powers. He predicted that by the end of the 1930s, there would be a "radical curtailment of the special privileges in Asia that we Occidentals have spent a century in acquiring." However, he refused to advocate withdrawal of western armies from the region.

== Views on Zionism and anti-Semitism ==
Gibbons was opposed to efforts to establish Israel in the Middle East, commonly known as Zionism. He believed that establishing a Jewish state in the Middle East would greatly increase anti-Semitism in Europe and the United States. Gibbons derided Zionism as an unnecessary effort to "preserve the Ghetto" for the Jewish people, when, in his view, they should have been making efforts to assimilate into American society. Gibbons viewed that Jews should have only "one allegiance - to the Government of the United States."

Gibbons, however, was an ardent opponent of anti-Semitism. In 1921, he signed an open letter, authored by President Woodrow Wilson, opposing anti-Semitism.

== Awards ==
During his lifetime, Gibbons received numerous awards and honors. In 1920, he received an honorary degree from the University of Pennsylvania. In 1927, he was awarded the Silver Medal of the city of Paris, and was made an honorary citizen of Le Touquet, France. He also received the Cross of the Legion of Honor from the French government for his efforts during World War I.

Gibbons was an early member of the Ends of the Earth Club, a group of artists and explorers founded in 1903. Its members included Mark Twain, General John Pershing, Admiral Robert Peary, and Gutzon Borglum (the sculptor of Mount Rushmore). Gibbons attended the 17th annual dinner of the group in 1920.

== Legacy ==
Gibbons is an important eyewitness to the Armenian genocide and the Greek genocide. Both events occurred in isolated regions at a time when few western observers were present. The contemporaneous reports that Gibbons made to western news organizations concerning these massacres helped corroborate and document these events for present-day scholars.

According to the New York Times, "the career of Dr. Gibbons was one of high adventure. He traveled to remote corners of the world to gain first hand information on the life, religions and political conditions in Asiatic and African territories." As such, he was a true-to-life inspiration for academic adventurers portrayed in films such as Indiana Jones.

In 1923, Gibbons donated to Princeton University over 1,100 books, pamphlets, manuscripts, personal notes and photographs relating to World War I. These and other papers of Dr. Gibbons have been preserved at the Seeley G. Mudd Manuscript Library at Princeton University.

== Books ==
His books include:

- The New Map of Europe: 1911–1914: A Study of Contemporary European National Movements and Wars. London: Duckworth & Co. 1914 – via Internet Archive.
- Paris Reborn (1915)
- The Blackest Page of Modern History: Events in Armenia in 1915 (1916)
- The New Map of Africa 1900-1916: A History of European Colonial Expansion and Colonial Diplomacy (1916)
- The Little Children of Luxembourg (1916)
- The Foundation of the Ottoman Empire: A History of the Osmanlis Up To the Death of Bayezid I: 1300–1403 (1916)
- Reconstruction of Poland and the Near East: Problems of Peace (1917)
- Songs from the Trenches: The Soul of the A.E.F. (1918)
- The question of Alsace-Lorraine in 1918 as Viewed by an American (1918)
- The New Map Of Asia: 1900–1919 (1919)
- France and Ourselves: Interpretative Studies: 1917–1919 (1920)
- Riviera Towns (1920)
- Great Britain in Egypt (1920)
- Venizelos (1920)
- Bases of Anglo-Saxon Solidarity (1921)
- Lithuania Recognition (with W.G. McAdoo) (1921)
- An Introduction to World Politics (1922)
- Anglo-Saxon Solidarity (1923)
- Europe Since 1918 (1923)
- America's Place in the World (1924)
- A Selected Bibliography of the World War (1924)
- John Wanamaker (1926)
- Ports of France (1926)
- Europe of Today (1927)
- The New Map of South America (1929)
- Nationalism and Internationalism (1929)
- Wider Horizons: The New Map of the World (1930)
- Contemporary World History (1932)
