= Ends of the Earth Club =

Group of artists and explorers

The Ends of the Earth Club was a group of artists and explorers founded in 1903. Its members included Mark Twain, General John Pershing, Admiral Robert Peary, Gutzon Borglum (the sculptor of Mount Rushmore), Herbert Adams Gibbons (a Princeton professor and journalist), and more than 100 other prominent businessmen and academics located, primarily, in the northeastern United States.

The group's honorary president was the British adventurer and writer, Rudyard Kipling. During the first three decades of the twentieth century, the group held an annual dinner at the Savoy Hotel in New York, where its members would meet and exchange stories about foreign travel and politics.

The members of the group generally favored Anglo American colonization of the non-European world. Mark Twain recalled an evening at the club in a dictation recorded on March 7, 1906. During the evening, the chairman of the dinner, General James L. Wilson, proudly told the group that they were "all members of the Anglo-Saxon race." Wilson further commented, "And when the Anglo-Saxon wants something, he takes it." Twain said that Wilson's comment meant that Englishmen and Americans were "thieves, highwaymen, and pirates – and proud of it", adding:

Out of all the English and Americans present, there was not one with the grace to get up and say he was ashamed of being an Anglo-Saxon, and also ashamed of being a member of the human race, since the race must abide under the presence upon it of the Anglo-Saxon taint.

The club was one of several such clubs in New York, including the now dormant Adventurers' Club of New York, and the still exant Explorers Club.
