= Scorpion Macehead =

Decorated ancient Egyptian macehead

Scorpion Macehead

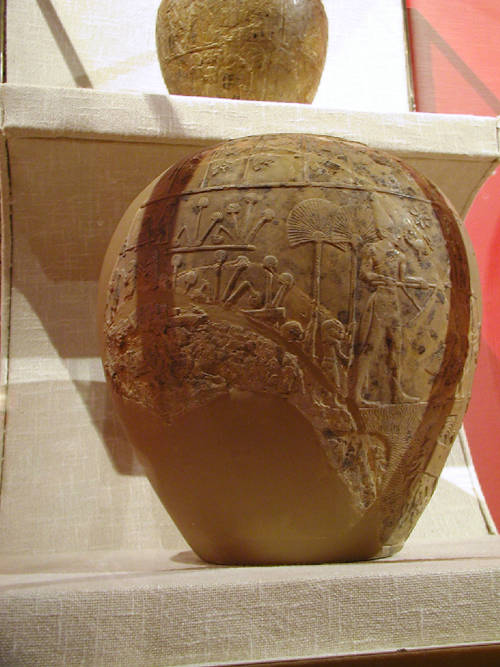
Scorpion macehead (Ashmolean Museum)

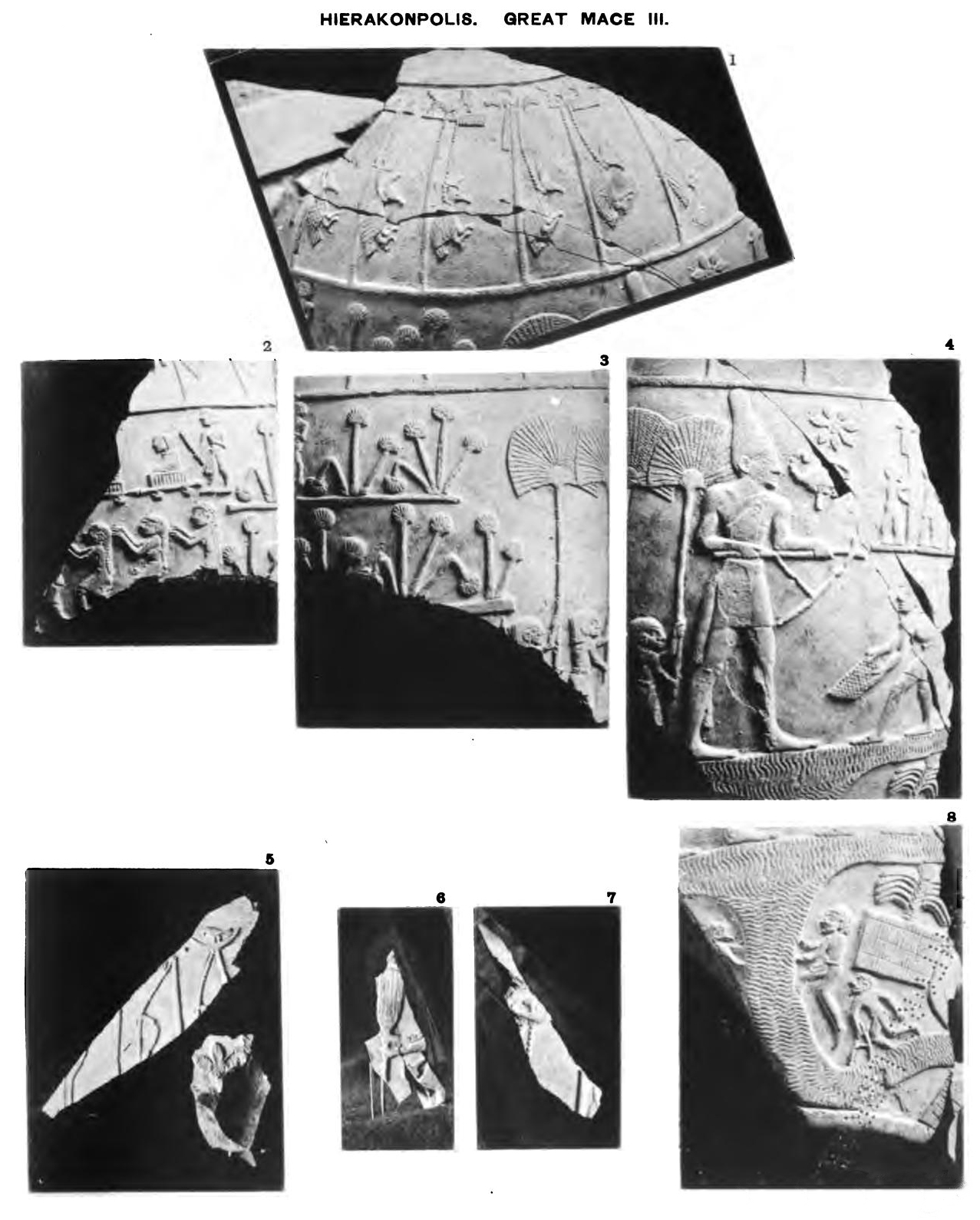
Details, at the time of discovery in Hierakonpolis.

The Scorpion macehead (also known as the Major Scorpion macehead) is a decorated ancient Egyptian macehead found by British archeologists James E. Quibell and Frederick W. Green in what they called the main deposit in the temple of Horus at Hierakonpolis during the dig season of 1897–1898. It measures 25 centimeters long, is made of limestone, is pear-shaped, and is attributed to the pharaoh Scorpion (c. 3200–3000 BCE) due to the glyph of a scorpion engraved close to the image of a king wearing the White Crown of Upper Egypt.

A second, smaller macehead fragment showing Scorpion wearing the Red Crown of Lower Egypt is referred to as the "Minor Scorpion macehead".

== Description of the maceheads ==
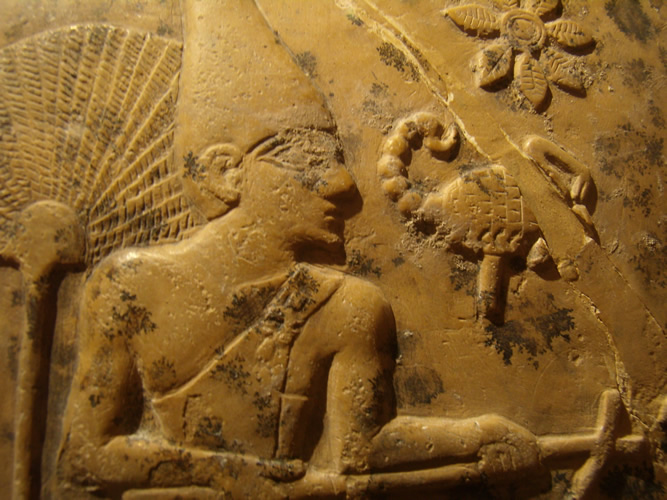
Scorpion macehead (detail) (Ashmolean Museum)

=== Egyptian pictorial conventions ===
Ancient Egyptian depiction obeyed a number of conventions. Perspective being unknown, depth was often hinted at by depicting a more remote scene above a closer one. People's lower body, their legs, arms, and head were almost always shown in profile, while their torso was depicted in frontal view, as was the eye. Legs are always apart. Size was often dependent on status, kings being depicted larger than their inferiors.

=== The Major Scorpion macehead ===
On the macehead the king sporting a bull's tail is standing by a body of water, probably a canal, holding a hoe. He is wearing the White Crown of Upper Egypt and is followed by two fan bearers. A scorpion and a rosette are depicted close to his head. He is facing a man holding a basket and men holding standards. A number of men are busy along the banks of the canal. In the rear of the king's retinue are some plants, a group of women clapping their hands and a small group of people, all of them facing away from the king. In the top register there is a row of nome standards. A bird is dangling from each of them, strung up by its neck.

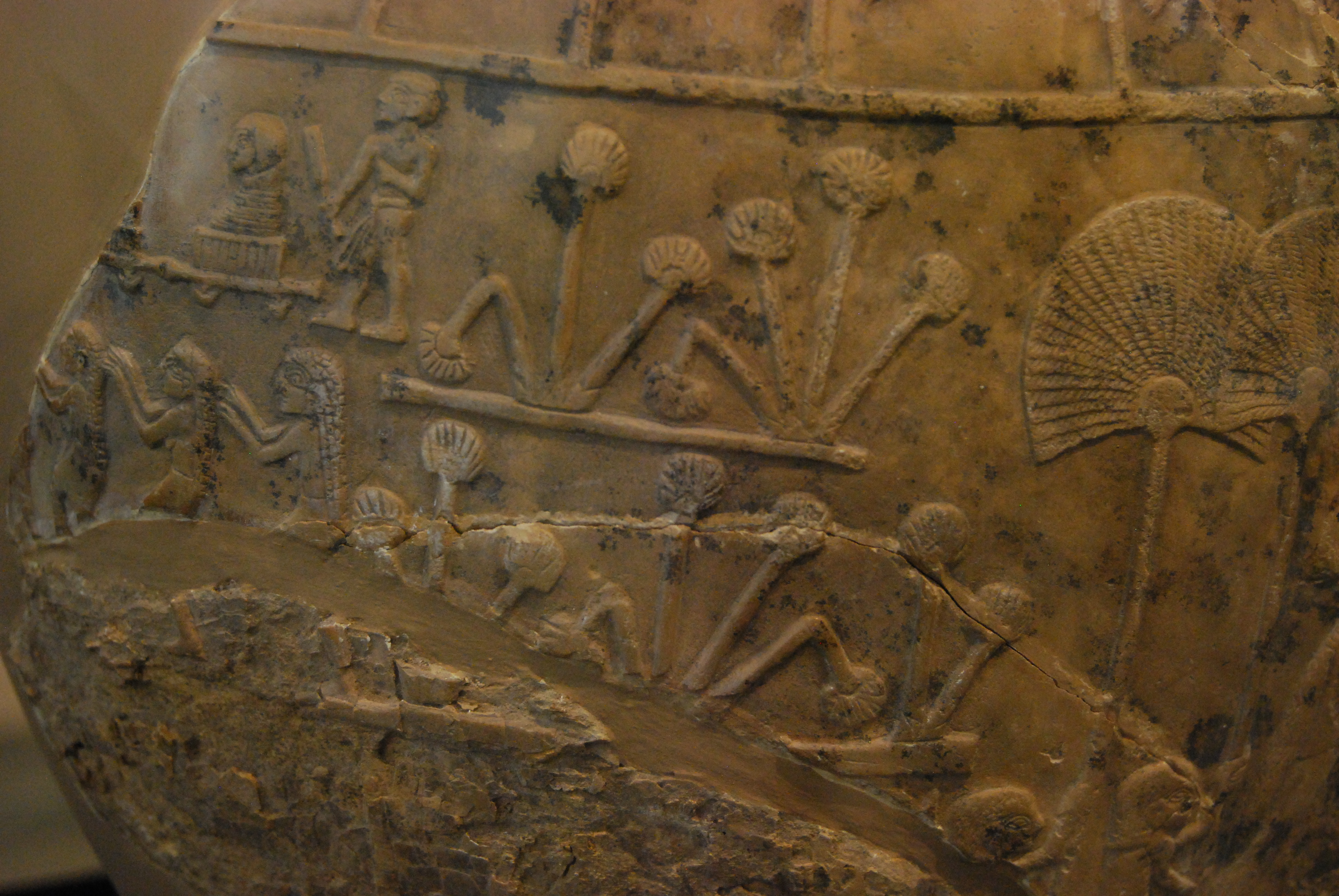

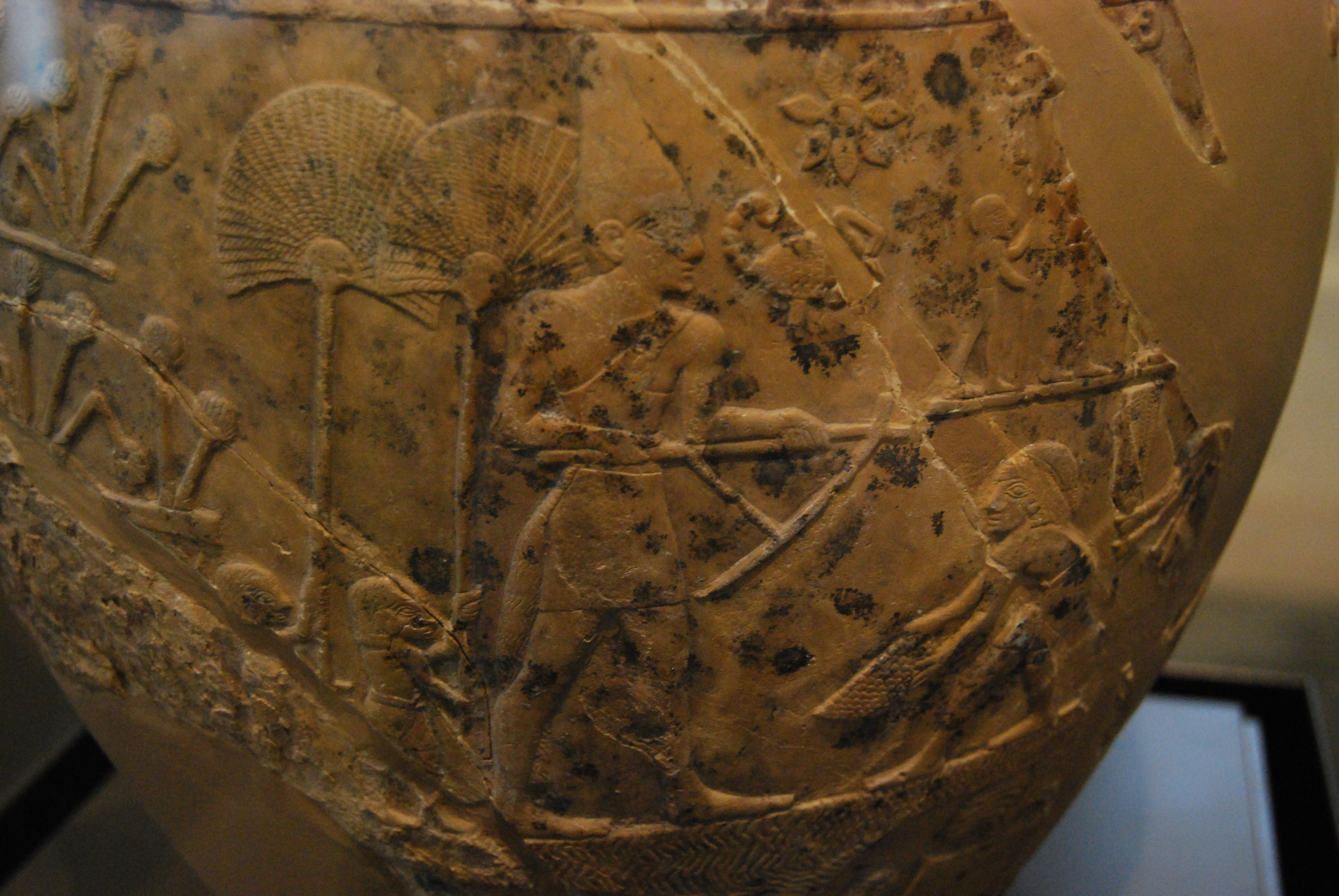

=== The Minor Scorpion macehead ===
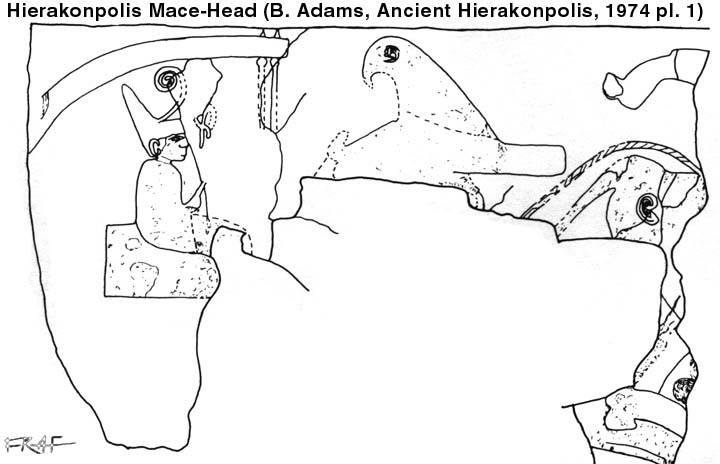
Drawing of the Minor Scorpion macehead

Little is left of this macehead and its imagery: A king wearing the Red Crown of Lower Egypt, sitting on a throne below a canopy, holding a flail. Beside his head are images of a scorpion and a rosette. Facing him is a falcon who may be holding an end of a rope in one of its claws – a motif also present on the Narmer Palette.

== Bibliography ==
- Edwards, I. E. S. (1925). The Cambridge Ancient History. Cambridge: Cambridge University Press. ISBN 978-0-521-07791-0.
- Millet, N. B. (1991). "The Narmer macehead and related objects". Journal of the American Research Center in Egypt. 28: 53–59. doi:10.2307/40000073. JSTOR 40000073.
- Wengrow, David (2006). The archaeology of early Egypt: Social transformations in North-East Africa, 10 000 to 2650 BC. Cambridge: Cambridge University Press.
- Yurco, F. J. (1995). "Narmer: First king of Upper and Lower Egypt. A Reconsideration of his palette and macehead". Journal of the Society for the Study of Egyptian Antiquities. 25.
