= Renée Friedman =

American Egyptologist

Renée Friedman is an American Egyptologist, primarily known for her work at Nekhen (Hierakonpolis).

== Life ==
Friedman received her BA from the University of California at Berkeley, where her thesis was on the predynastic Egyptian cemetery at Naga ed Der. She earned her PhD in 1994 for work on predynastic ceramics.

In 1996, along with Barbara Adams, she began working as co-director of the American Hierakonpolis Expedition, which had been on a 4-year hiatus following the death of the former director Walter Fairservis.

== Works ==
- 1989 Fish and Fishing in Ancient Egypt. Aris and Phillips, Warminster, England. [with D.J. Brewer] American University in Cairo. 1990. 109pp. 1
- 1992 The Followers of Horus: Studies Dedicated to Michael Allen Hoffman. Oxbow Press, Oxford. [edited with Barbara Adams] 354pp.
- 1998 Egypt. British Museum Press. [with Vivian Davies] 224pp. Issued in USA as Egypt Uncovered.
- 2002 Egypt and Nubia. Gifts of the Desert. 328pp. British Museum Press. Editor.
