= Hierakonpolis =

Religious and political capital of Upper Egypt in Ancient Egypt

Nekhen
- Hierakonpolis (Greek)
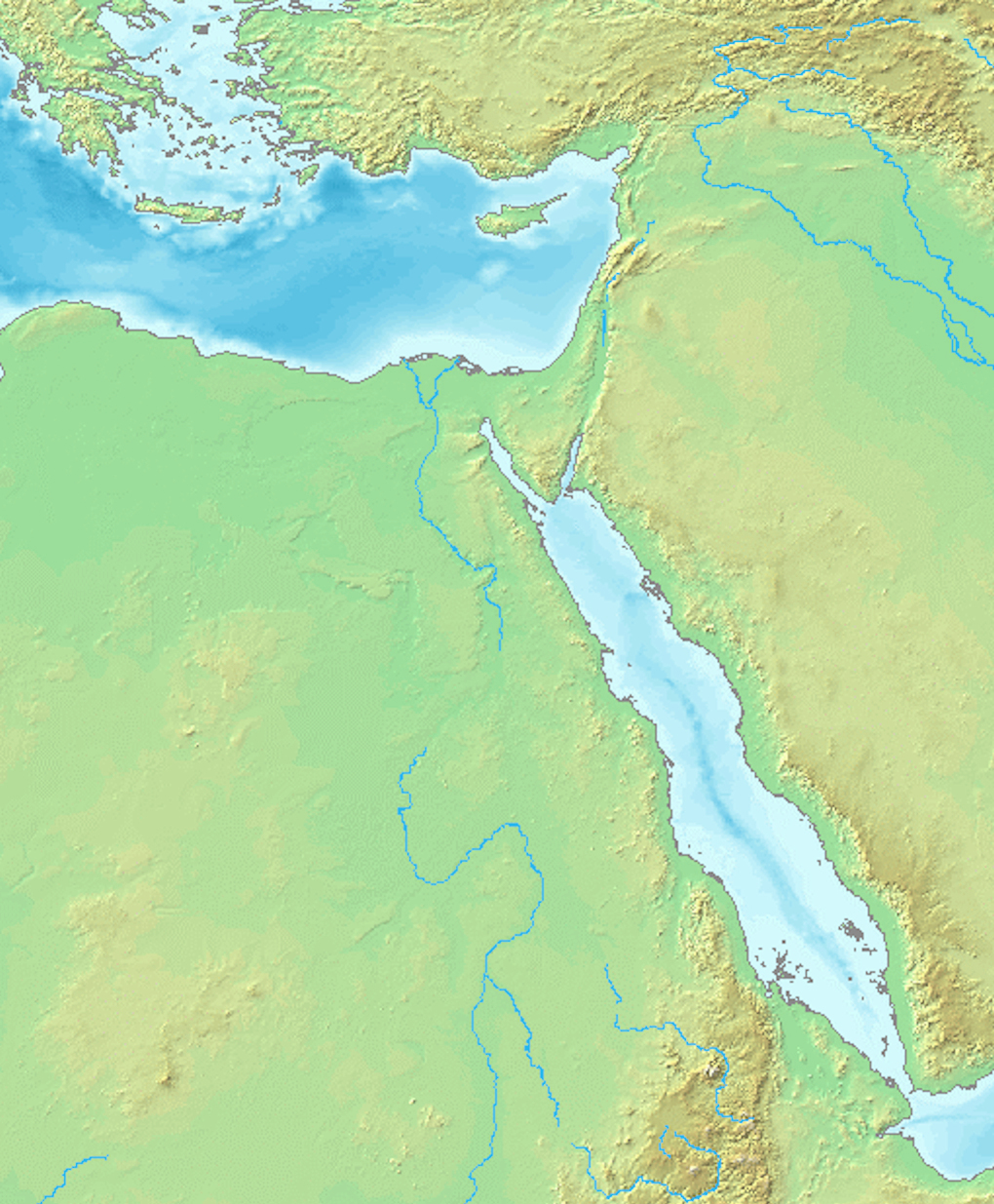
- Location within Northeast Africa Location within Egypt
- 25°5′50″N 32°46′46″E
- Location: Aswan Governorate, Egypt

Site notes
- Material: Possibly, oldest painted Ancient Egyptian tomb

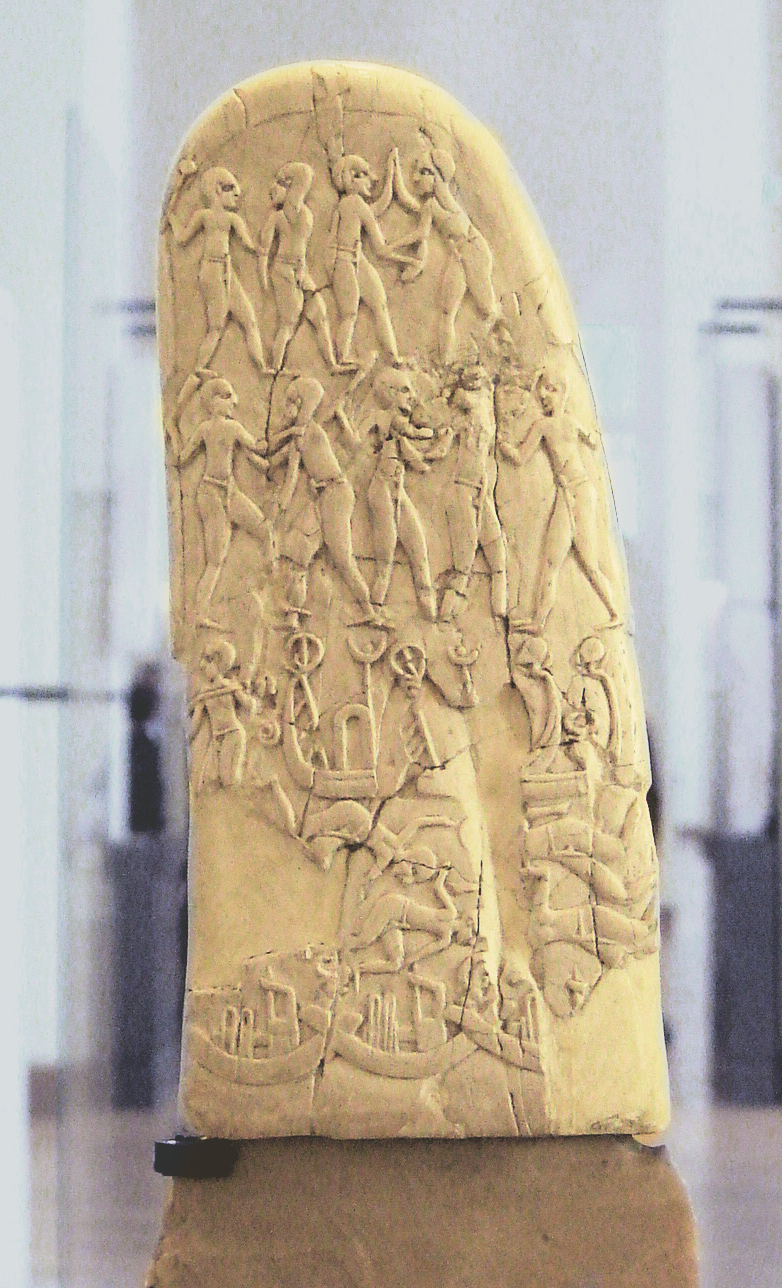
Possible illustration of the conflict between Abydos and Nekhen (Hierakonpolis), on the Gebel el-Arak Knife, Louvre Museum, 3300–3200 BCE.

Nekhen (/ˈnɛkən/, Ancient Egyptian: nḫn), also known as Hierakonpolis (/ˌhaɪərəˈkɒnpəlɪs/; Greek: Ἱεράκων πόλις, romanized: Hierákōn pólis, meaning City of Hawks or City of Falcons, a reference to Horus; Egyptian Arabic: الكوم الأحمر, romanized: el-Kōm el-Aḥmar, lit. 'the Red Mound') was the religious and political capital of Upper Egypt at the end of prehistoric Egypt (c. 3200–3100 BC) and probably also during the Early Dynastic Period (c. 3100–2686 BC).

Located in Upper Egypt about 100 kilometers south of the modern-day city of Luxor, Nekhen has been the subject of extensive archeological research over the past one and half centuries, and has yielded a large number of artifacts that give a greater understanding to this period of ancient Egyptian history. The city was the center of cult worship of the god Horus, who is said to have his origins in Nekhen as its tutelary deity. Tombs, temples, breweries, houses, and other structures have all been discovered that date back to the predynastic era. The oldest known tomb with painted decoration, known as the Painted Tomb, is located in Nekhen and is thought to date to c. 3500–3200 BC. It shares distinctive imagery with artifacts from the Gerzeh culture. Nekhen was also the discovery location for the Narmer Palette, which contains one of the first depictions of ancient Egyptian kingship, in addition to an array of other artifacts from the predynastic period.

== History ==
The first settlement at Nekhen dates from either the predynastic Amratian culture (c. 4400 BC) or the late Badarian culture (c. 5000 BC). At its height, from c. 3400 BC, Nekhen had at least 5,000 and possibly as many as 10,000 inhabitants. Most of Upper Egypt then became unified under rulers from Abydos during the Naqada III period (3200–3000 BCE) at the expense of rival cities, especially Nekhen (Hierakonpolis). The conflicts leading to the supremacy of Abydos may be what appear on numerous reliefs from the Naqada II period, such as the Gebel el-Arak Knife, or the frieze of Tomb 100 at Nekhen.

Nekhen was the center of the cult of a falcon deity, Horus of Nekhen, and raised one of the most ancient Egyptian temples in Egypt. It was here that the body of Horus was supposedly entombed, and Horus was often deeply connected and associated with Nekhen and Upper Egypt in general. Given Horus' vital importance in the Egyptian pantheon and for monarchical legitimacy, Nekhen retained its importance as the center for this divine patron of the kings long after the site had otherwise declined.

There are later tombs at Nekhen, dating to the Middle Kingdom, Second Intermediate Period, and New Kingdom. In the painted tomb of Horemkhauef a biographical inscription reporting a journey to the capital by him was found. He lived during the Second Intermediate Period. Because it had a strong association with Egyptian religious ideas about kingship, the temple of Horus at Nekhen was used as late as the Ptolemaic Kingdom, persisting as a religious center throughout the thousands of years of Ancient Egyptian culture.

== Excavation ==
The ruins of the city were originally excavated toward the end of the nineteenth century by the English archaeologists James Quibell and Frederick W. Green. Quibell and Green discovered the "Main Deposit", a foundation deposit beneath the temple, in 1894. Quibell originally was trained under Flinders Petrie, the father of modern Egyptology, however, he failed to follow Petrie's methods. The temple was a difficult site to excavate to begin with, so his excavation was poorly conducted and then, poorly documented. Specifically, the situational context of the items therein is poorly recorded and often, the reports of Quibell and Green are in contradiction.

John Garstang excavated at Nekhen from 1905–1906. He initially hoped to excavate the town site, but encountered difficulties working there, and soon turned his attention to the area he misidentified as a 'fort' instead. That site dates to the second dynasty King Khasekhemwy. Beneath that area, Garstang excavated a Predynastic cemetery consisting of 188 graves, which served the bulk of the city population during the late Predynastic and Early Dynastic periods, revealing the burial practices of the non-elite Egyptians living at Nekhen.

In 1967, Walter Fairservis of Vassar College began more extensive archeological research in the city. More recently, the concession was excavated further by a multinational team of archaeologists, Egyptologists, geologists, and members of other sciences, which was coordinated by Michael Hoffman until his death in 1990, then by Barbara Adams of University College London and Dr. Renée Friedman representing the University of California, Berkeley and the British Museum, until Barbara Adams's death in 2002, and by Renée Friedman thereafter.

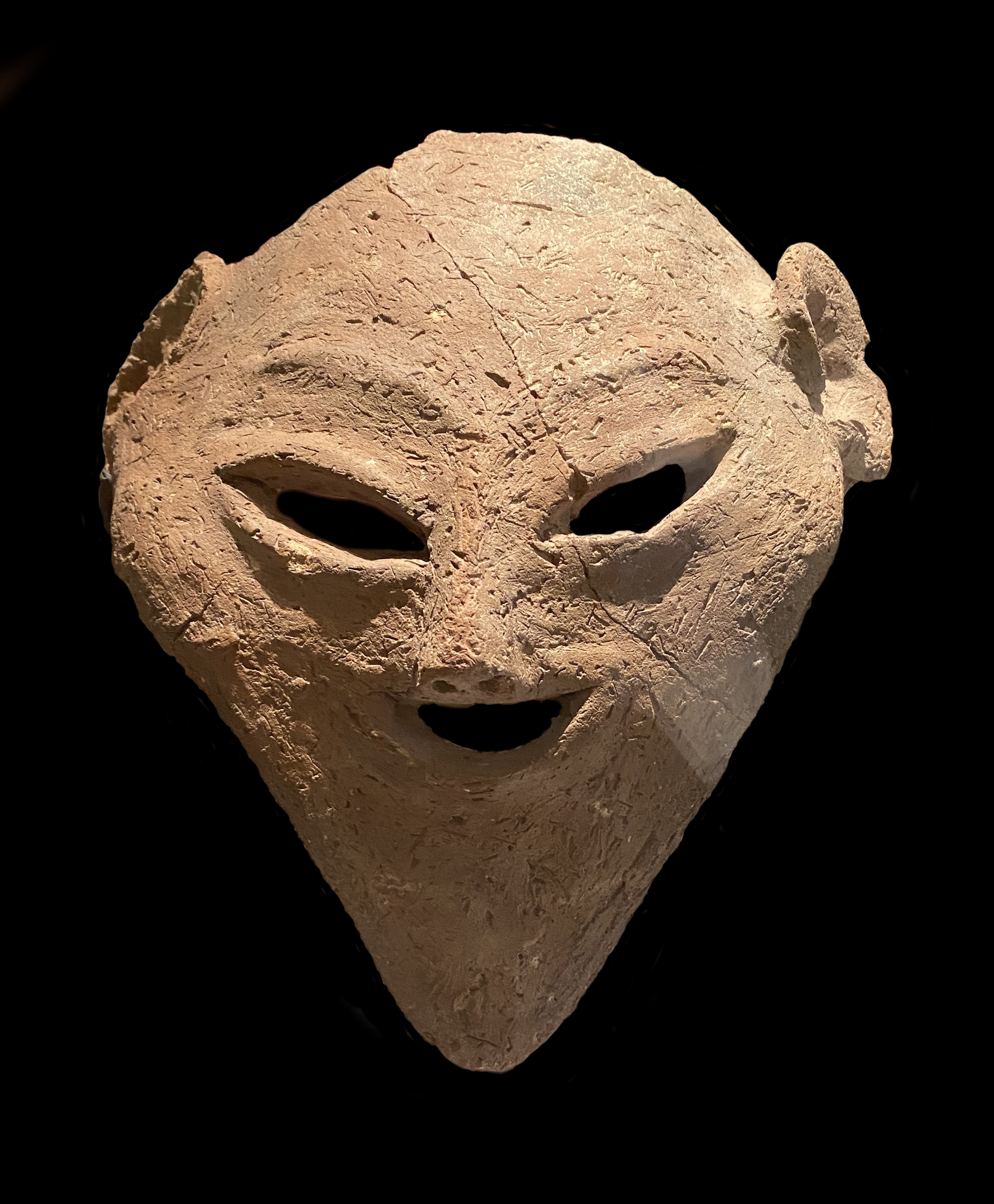
Death mask. Naqada Ic–IIa (3750 BC). Hierakonpolis elite cemetery (HK6, Tomb 16).

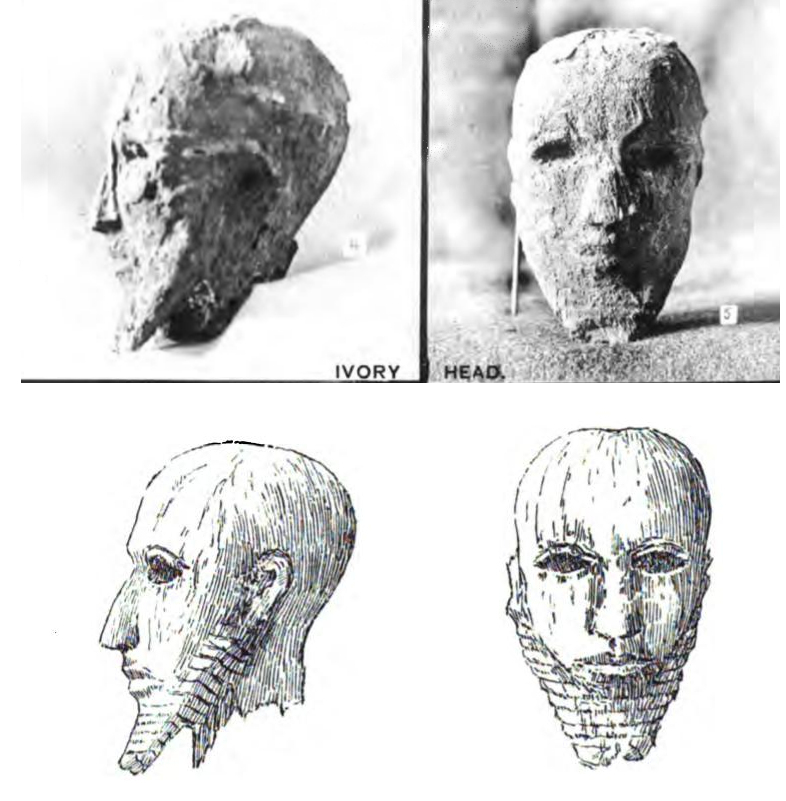
Hierakonpolis ivory head.

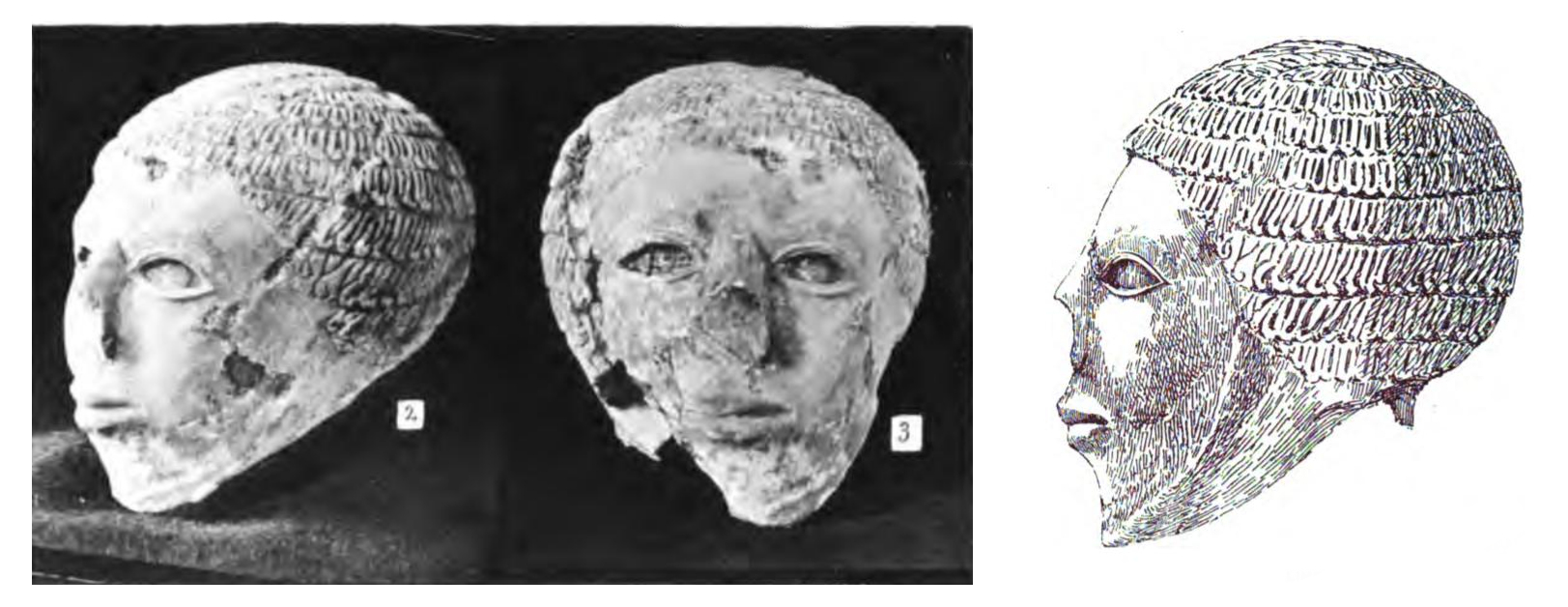
Hierakonpolis limestone head of a “Libyan-Negro” (a mixed race individual of both Libyan and likely Nubian descent).

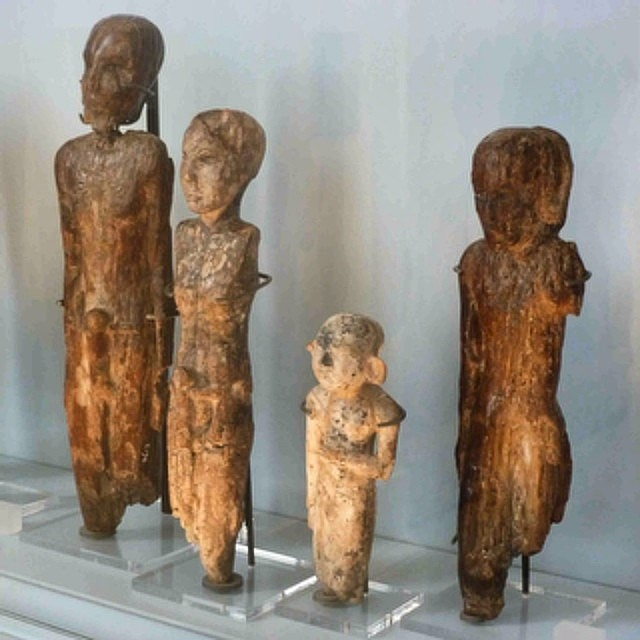
Male statuettes with penile sheaths. Naqada III (3300–3000 BC) – Early Dynastic, Dynasty I (3000–2890 BC).

== Possible ritual structures ==
The structure at Nekhen known by the misnomer "fort" is a massive mud-brick enclosure built by king Khasekhemwy of the Second Dynasty. It appears to be similar in structure and ritual purpose as the similarly misidentified 'forts' constructed at Abydos, all without apparent military function. The true function of these structures is unknown, but they seem to be related to the rituals of kingship and the culture. Religion was interwoven inexorably with kingship in Ancient Egypt. One suggestion is that Khasekhem, as Khasekhemwy was initially known, had originally planned to be buried at Hierakonpolis, where he ruled with the followers of Horus and began to build his funerary enclosure. However, when he later reunited Egypt and changed his name to Khasekhemwy, he opted to build a new enclosure and tomb in Umm El Qa'ab at Abydos instead.

The ritual structure at Nekhen was built on a prehistoric cemetery. The excavations there, as well as the work of later brick robbers, have seriously undermined the walls and led to the near collapse of the structure. For two years, during 2005 and 2006, the team led by Friedman attempted to stabilize the existing structure and support the endangered areas of the structure with new mudbricks.

Excavations at Hierakonpolis (Upper Egypt) in 1998 found archaeological evidence of ritual masks similar to those used in locations further south of Egypt and significant amounts of obsidian which were linked to Ethiopian quarry sites.

== Finds and artifacts ==
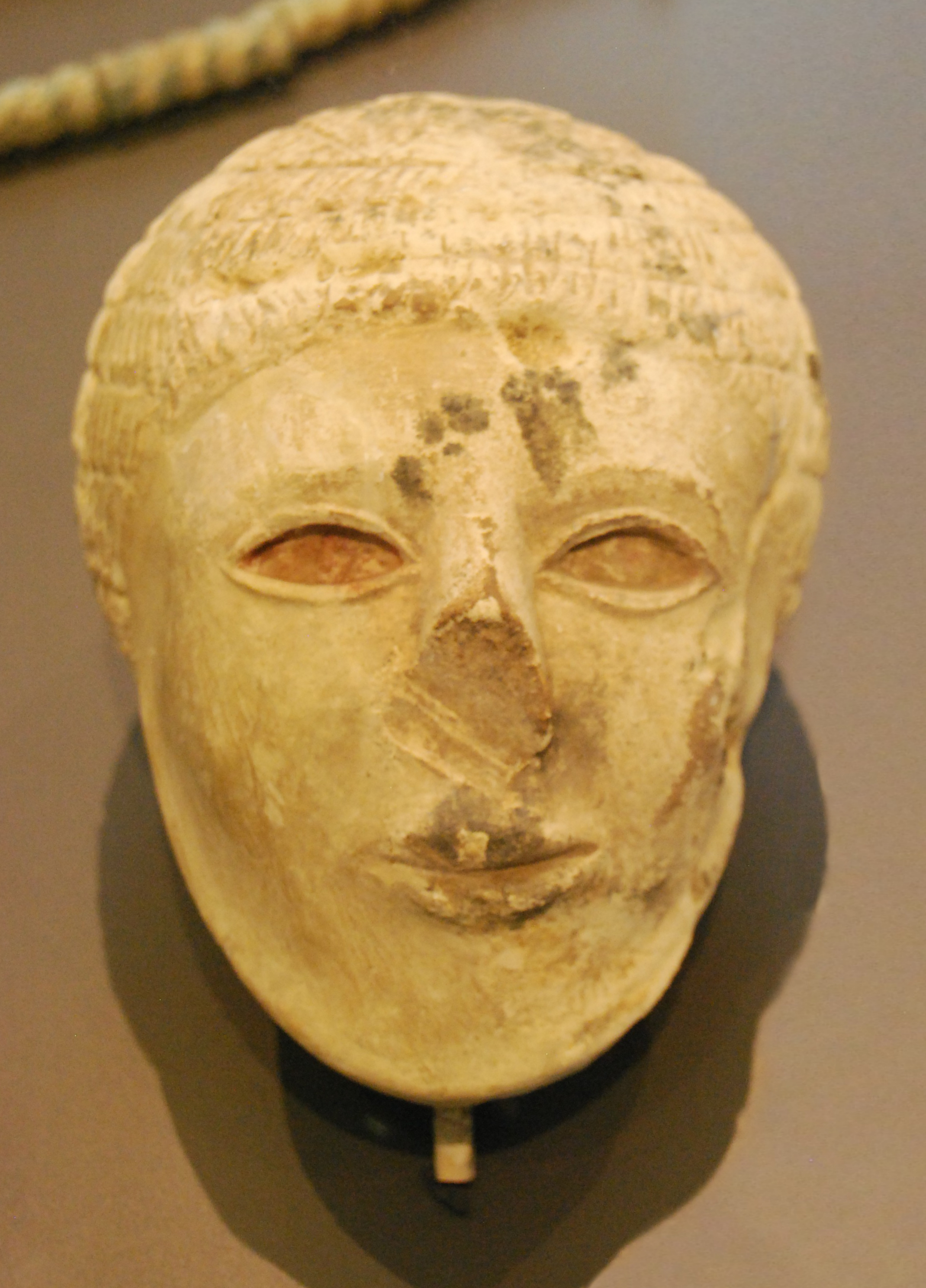
Human figurine from the main deposit at Nekhen, Naqada III period. Ashmolean Museum.

The most famous artifact commonly associated with Nekhen is the celebrated Narmer Palette. James Quibell's report made in 1900 put the palette in the main deposit, but Green's report in 1902 put it about one to two yards away. Green's version is substantiated by earlier field notes (Quibell kept none), so it is now the accepted record of events.

The main deposit dates to the early Old Kingdom, but the artistic style of the objects in the deposit indicate that they were from Naqada III and were moved into the deposit at a later date. The other important item in the deposit clearly dates to the late prehistoric. This object, the Scorpion Macehead, depicts a king known only by the ideogram for scorpion, now called Scorpion II, participating in what seems to be a ritual irrigation ceremony. Although the Narmer Palette is more famous because it shows the first king to wear both the crowns of Upper and Lower Egypt, the Scorpion Macehead indicates some early military hostility with the north by showing dead lapwings, the symbol of Lower Egypt, hung from standards.

=== Hierakonpolis Tomb 100, "The Painted Tomb" ===
Tomb 100, discovered in Nekhen, is the only known predynastic tomb with a mural painted on its plaster walls. The sepulcher is thought to date to the Naqada II period (c. 3500–3200 BC). Tomb 100 is generally considered as part of a wider cultural step towards more elaborate and ornamented burial rituals in ancient Egypt.

It is presumed that the mural shows religious scenes and images. It includes figures featured in Egyptian culture for three thousand years—a funerary procession of barques, presumably a goddess standing between two upright lionesses, a wheel of various horned quadrupeds, several examples of a staff that became associated with the deity of the earliest cattle culture and one being held up by a heavy-breasted goddess. Animals depicted include wild asses or zebras, ibexes, ostriches, lionesses, impalas, gazelles, and cattle.

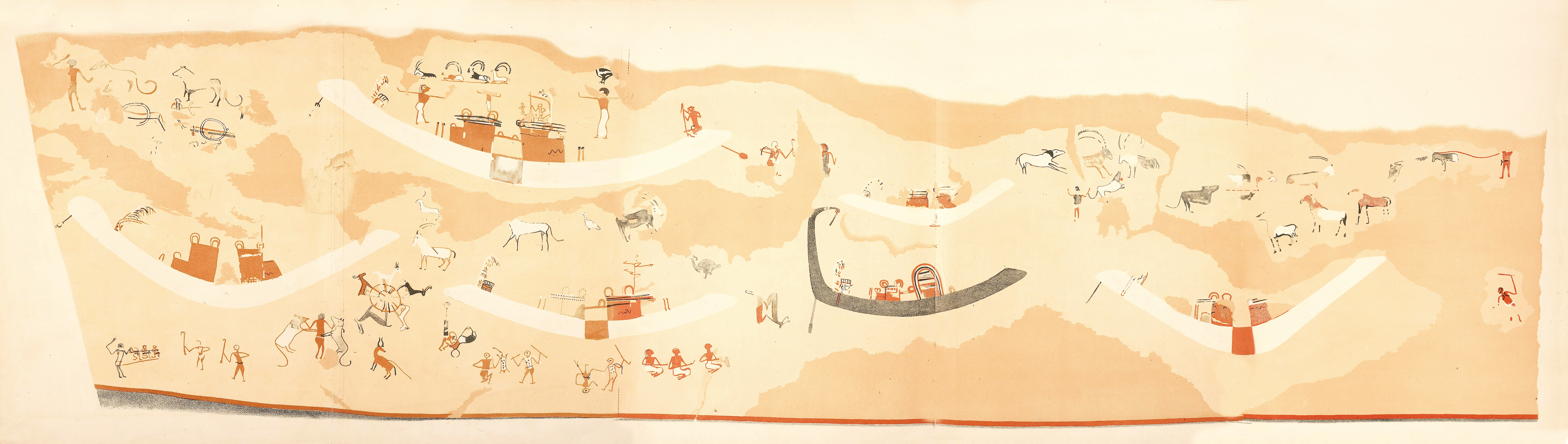
An ancient Nekhen tomb painting in plaster with barques, staffs, goddesses, and animals - possibly the earliest example of an Egyptian tomb mural

Several interpretations of the themes and designs visible in the Nekhen fresco have been associated with a distinctly foreign artifact found in Egypt, the Gebel el-Arak Knife (c. 3500–3200 BCE), with a Mesopotamian scene described as the Master of animals, showing a presumed figure between two lions, presumed fighting scenes, or the boats.

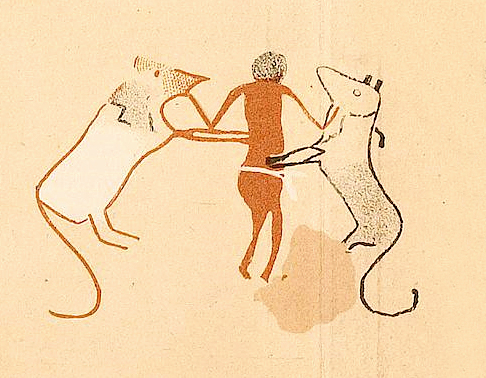
Nekhen Tomb 100 image: figure with lions

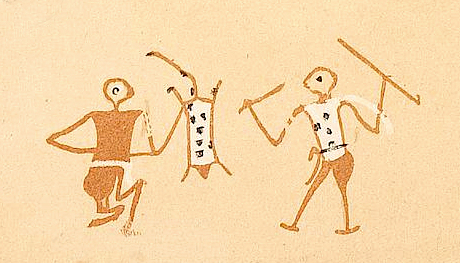
Nekhen Tomb 100 image: presumed warriors

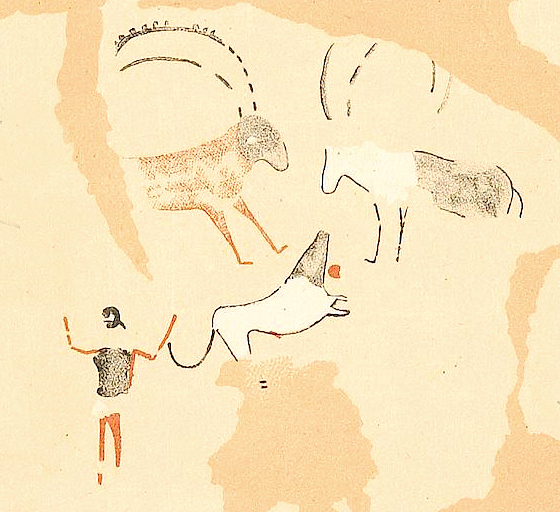
Nekhen Tomb 100 image: presumed hunting

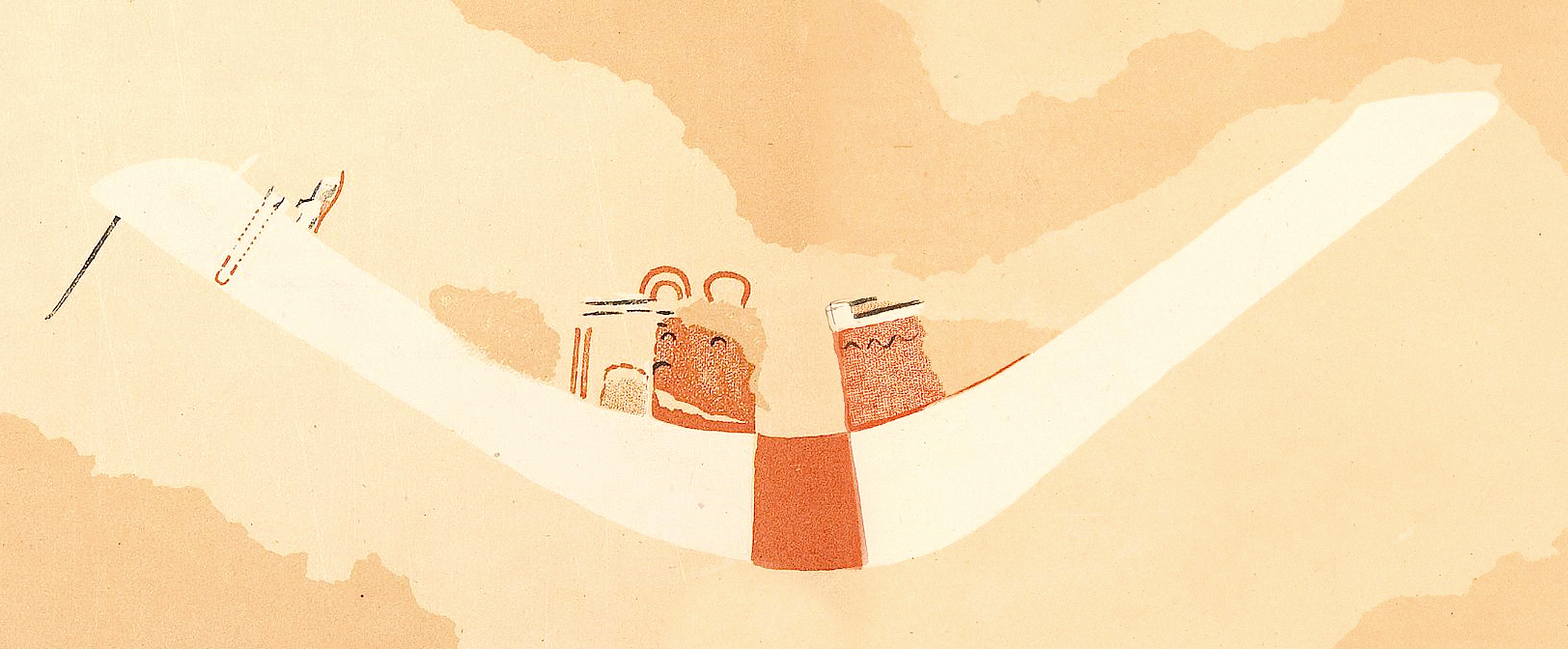
Nekhen Tomb 100 image: a barque

=== Oldest-known zoo ===
The oldest known zoological collection was revealed during excavations at Nekhen in 2009 of a menagerie that dates to c. 3500 BC. The animals, numbering in totality fourteen during May 2015, include a leopard, two crocodiles, hippopotami, hartebeest, two elephants, baboons, African wildcats, and domestic cats. Animals discovered at the cemetery site were found to have had broken bones, which seem to indicate injuries from trying to escape their captivity or from violence at the hands of their owners.

=== Cylinder seals ===
Cylinder seals at Nekhen include some of the first known scenes of an ancient Egyptian king smiting captive enemies with a mace, a recurring motif in ancient Egyptian artwork. Cylinder seals are generally thought to have been derived from Mesopotamian examples, in an instance of Egypt-Mesopotamia relations.

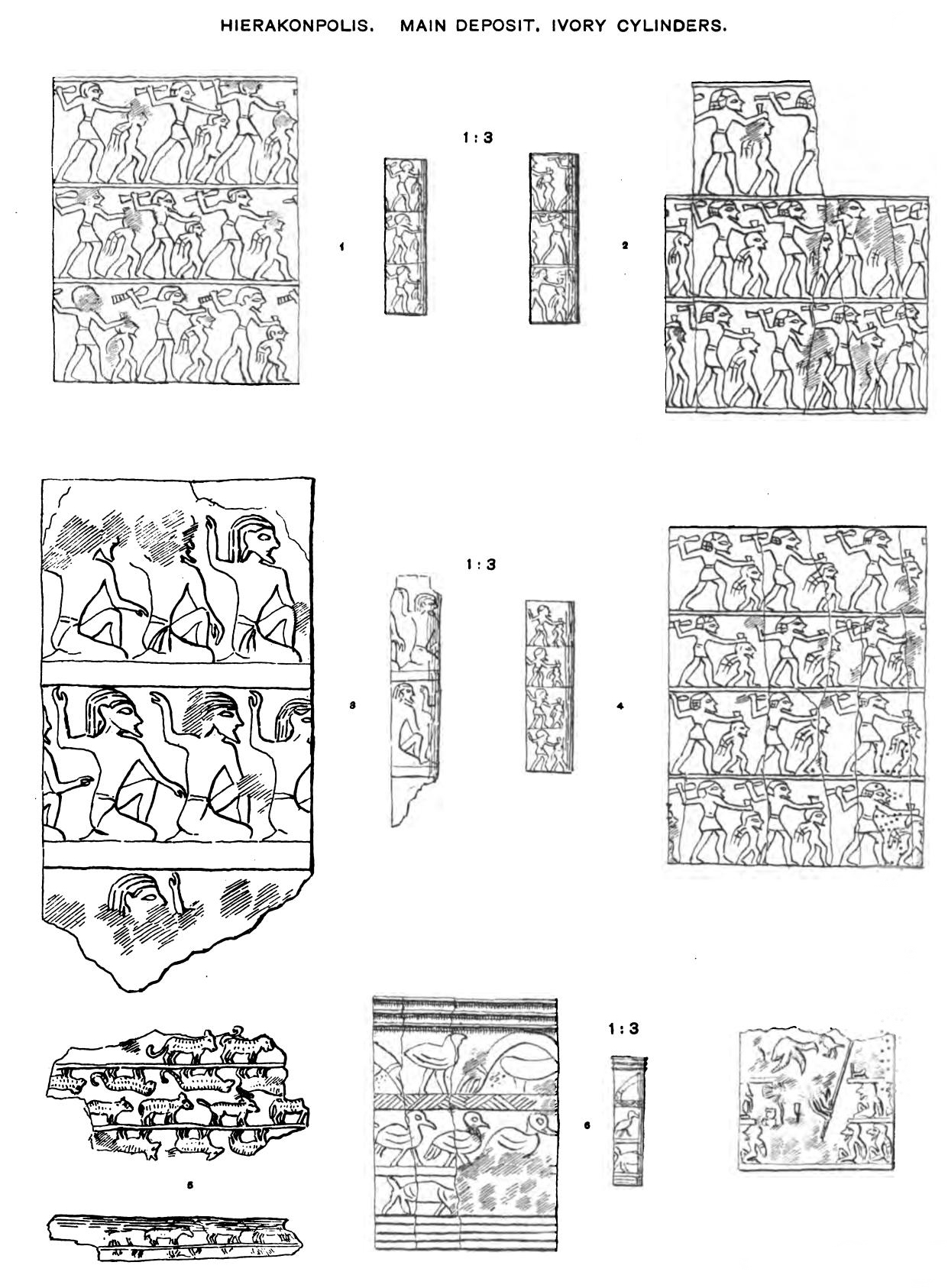
Ivory cylinder seals discovered in Nekhen

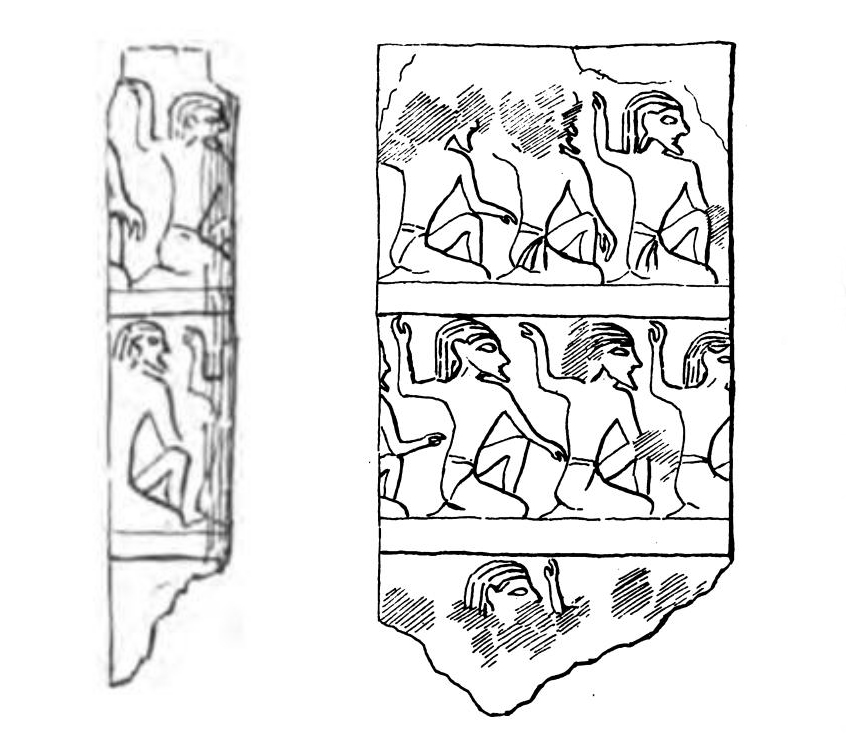
Nekhen ivory cylinder with kneeling men, with impression (drawing)

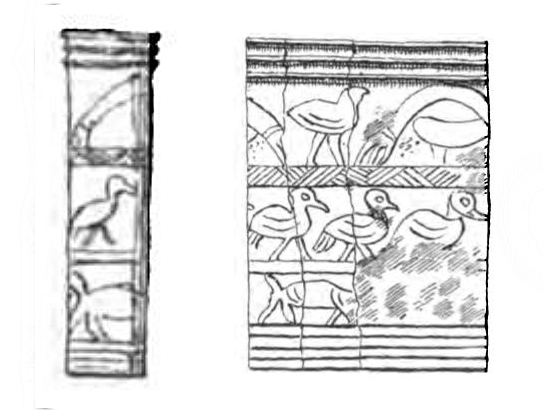
Nekhen ivory cylinder with animals, with impression (drawing)

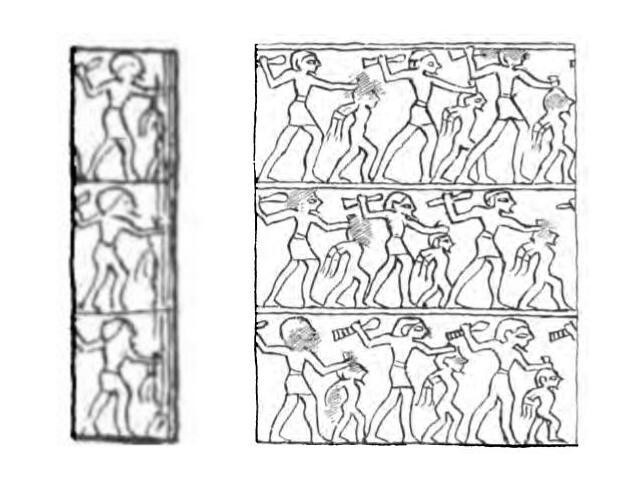
Nekhen ivory cylinder seal with impression of king smiting a captive (drawing)

=== Cosmetic palettes ===
Several of the most well-preserved pre-Dynastic decorated palettes have been discovered in Nekhen, including the famous Narmer Palette, which shows one of the earlier depictions of an Egyptian pharaoh. They display images of animals such as the mythical serpopards, and also incorporate some of the first discovered use of hieroglyphs.

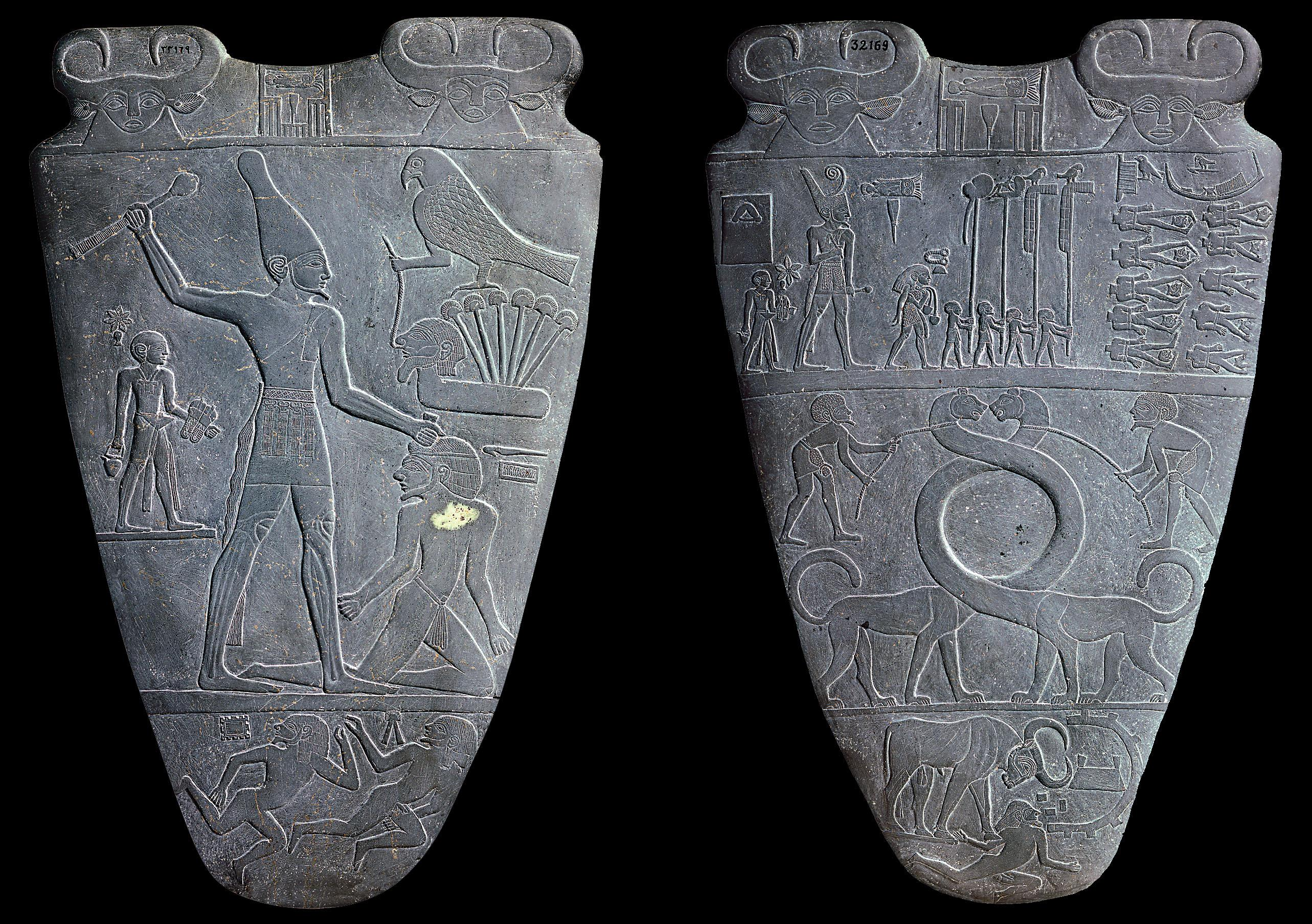
The Narmer Palette, with serpopards, Nekhen

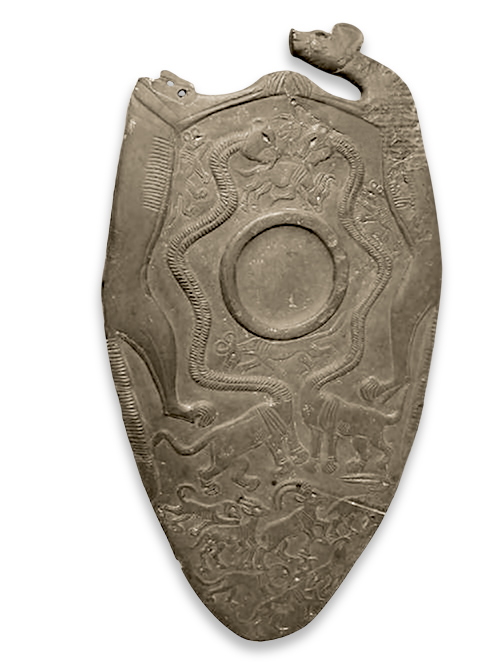
The Two Dog Palette, with serpopards, Nekhen

=== Maceheads ===
Several predynastic-era maceheads have been discovered in Nekhen, including the Narmer macehead and the Scorpion Macehead, which feature the kings Narmer and Scorpion respectively.

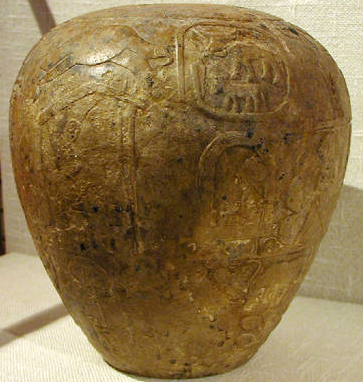
The Narmer macehead found in Nekhen

Content of the Narmer macehead (drawing)

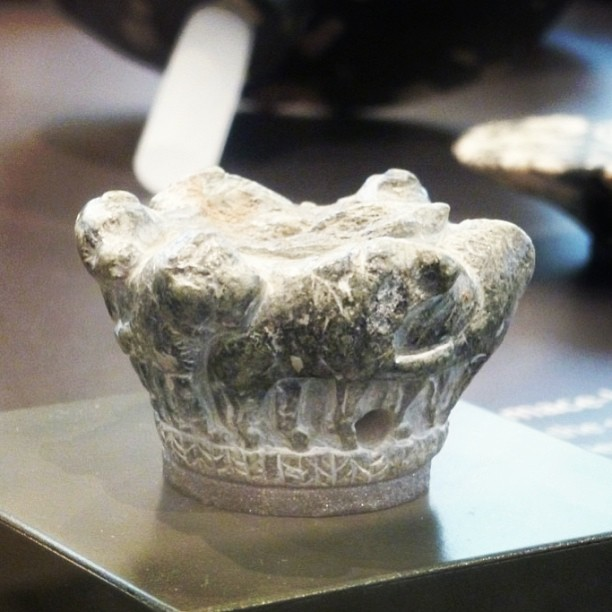
Remains of a carved serpentine mace-head found in Nekhen

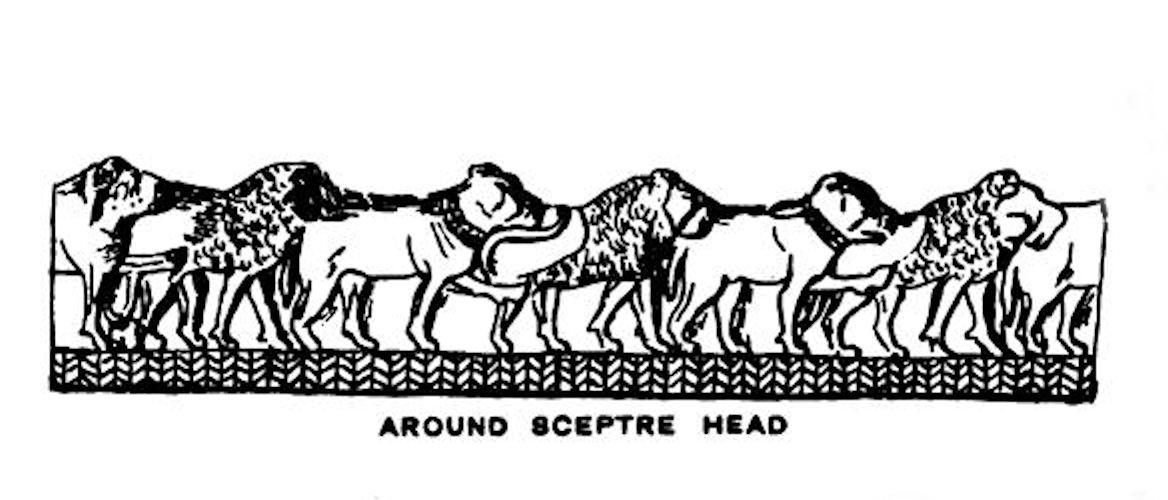
Design on remains of the serpentine macehead (drawing)

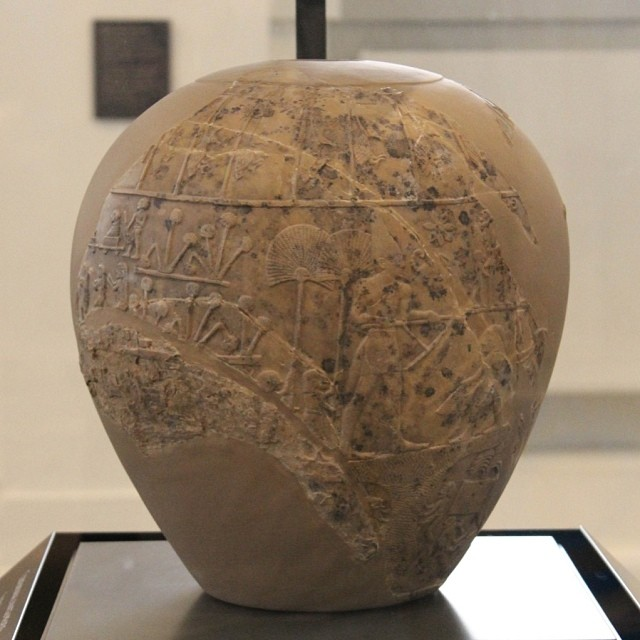
Scorpion Macehead

== Beer production ==
Archaeochemical analyses of residues from ceramic vats at Hierakonpolis provide some of the earliest physical evidence for beer production in Egypt. Chemical and microscopic study of residues recovered from Predynastic contexts identified barley and wheat fragments, remains of dates and grapes, and compounds associated with fermentation such as simple sugars, carboxylic acids, and free amino acids. Radiocarbon calibrated dates place the residues at about 3500 to 3400 cal BC, which corresponds to the late Predynastic to early Dynastic transition. These results show that brewing was practiced at the site early in Egyptian history and support interpretations that beer was both a dietary staple and a component of ritual and economic activities.

== Archaeological reports ==
- Quibell, James Edward; Green, F. W.; Petrie, W. M. Flinders (William Matthew Flinders) (1900). Hierakonpolis . London, B. Quaritch.
