= Walter Fairservis =

American archaeologist (1921–1994)

Walter Ashlin Fairservis Jr.
- Born: February 17, 1921; Brooklyn, New York, US
- Died: July 19, 1994 (aged 73); Sharon, Connecticut, US
- Education: Columbia University (BA and MA), Harvard University (MA and PhD)
- Occupations: Archaeologist, anthropologist, playwright and producer
- Known for: Locating and exploring "lost" cities - archeologist at American Museum of Natural History

Walter Ashlin Fairservis Jr. (1921 – 1994) was an American archaeologist who excavated in Afghanistan, Hierakonpolis, and in the Indus Valley of Pakistan. He worked in the American Museum of Natural History for over thirty years and was director of the Burke Museum of Natural History in Seattle. He was a professor of archeology and Asian studies at Vassar College until his retirement just before his death in 1994.

The son of actress Edith Yeager, Fairservis played roles in Shakespeare plays, wrote scripts for television, and founded his own nonprofit theatre, the East-West Fusion Theatre, in New York City in 1983.

== Early life and education ==
He was born in Brooklyn, New York, United States, on February 17, 1921. He was the only child of parents Walter Fairservis Sr. and actress Edith Yeager. He graduated from A.B. Davis High School in Mount Vernon, NY in 1939 where he excelled in track and field. He received an athletic scholarship from the University of Chicago, then moved to Columbia University where he studied anthropology.

In the 1940s Fairservis "served as a lieutenant in Army Intelligence" and as a "member of General Douglas MacArthur's occupation staff" in Japan. In 1945 he was occupying the Imperial Household Museum alongside several other servicemen when he was contacted by his Columbia professor Harry L. Shapiro, who was searching for a lost prehominid skull from the Solo Man excavation led by Gustav von Koenigswald. Fairservis quickly located the missing skull in the museum's collection and brought it to New York, where he offered it directly to von Koenigswald.

Following the end of the war he completed an M.A. in anthropology from Columbia University and a second M.A. and a Ph.D. from Harvard University. He became a member of the Ends of the Earth Club of New York.

== Career ==
Fairservis "led an American archaeological expedition to Afghanistan" after graduating with his PhD from Harvard. In 1948 he began a thirty-year relationship with the American Museum of Natural History and became the director of the Burke Museum of Natural History in Seattle. Using his theatre experience, Fairservis designed the sets at the Burke Memorial Museum to "look like stage sets, where visitors might immerse themselves as participants in the cultures being displayed." Using live animals, he argued that "museums shouldn’t resemble mausoleums, and that 'living exhibitions' would serve the public better than collections of stuffed animals." He resigned in 1968 when met with disapproval by the museum that his exhibits didn't attract the funds needed to cover the expensive costs they incurred.

In 1969 he became faculty at Vassar College as a professor of archeology and Asian studies, where he remained until he retired shortly before his death in 1994. He had been directing "archaeological excavations at Hierakonpolis in Egypt and in the Indus Valley of Pakistan. In 1969 Fairservis and his partner Michael Hoffman felt that it was time to begin excavations in Egypt again. Excavations there had been paused since the Great Depression, but political tensions kept Fairservis and Hoffman away from the Hierakonpolis site until 1978, funded with grants from Vassar College, the Smithsonian Institution and the Virginia Museum of Fine Arts.

== Theatre ==
The son of actress Edith Yeager, Fairservis toured with his mother and had played in twenty-three Shakespearean plays by the time he was twenty one years old. In the 1970's Fairservis wrote scripts for CBS's "Odyssey" and "Adventure" series. He worked with The Sharon Playhouse and Orson Welles' Mercury Theater. In 1983 Fairservis "founded the nonprofit East-West Fusion Theatre and established the Center for East-West Studies at his home." Over 100 productions were produced by this theatre. In 1992 the East-West Fusion Theatre came under the leadership of Fairservis's daughter Tevoit Fairservis who taught "Western Asian theater and dance at CW Post University".

In 1992, Fairservis's theatre the East-West Fusion Theatre staged one of Fairservis's plays "Yamashita! Yamashita!" about the trial and execution of General Tomoyuki Yamashita for "atrocities committed by soldiers under his command". Fairservis said "I was a Japanese language officer under Gen MacArthur and I knew about the trial in Tokyo where evidence was falsified to convict Yamashita".

== Personal life ==
His wife was Jan Bell "Jano" Southerland, an artist and illustrator. They were married in the summer of 1950.

Fairservis died in Sharon, Connecticut in 1994.

== Works ==
Some of his notable books are:

- Before the Buddha Came
- The Roots of Ancient India
- Cave Paintings of the Great Hunters
- The Ancient Kingdoms of the Nile and the Doomed Monuments of Nubia
- The Archeology of the Southern Gobi-Mongolia
- The Harappan Civilization and Its Writing: A Model for the Decipherment of the Indus Script
- The Threshold of Civilization: An Experiment in Prehistory
- The Origins of Oriental Civilization
- Asia: Traditions and Treasures

== Professional organizations and associations ==
- Ends of the Earth Club of New York.
- Associate at the Peabody Museum of Natural History at Harvard University
- Penn Museum at the University of Pennsylvania
