= Oxford Palette =

Egyptian archaeological artifact

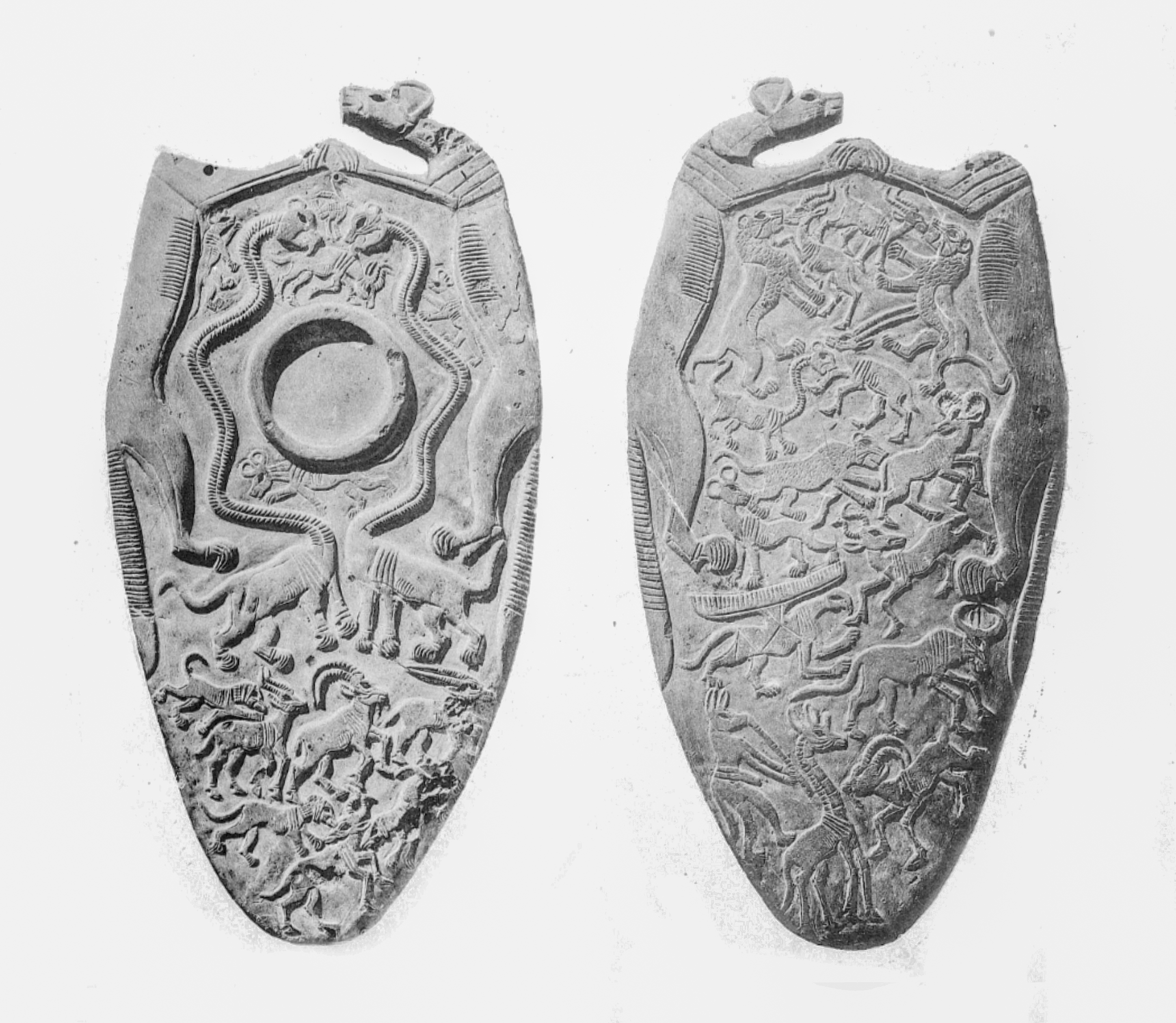
- Material: Siltstone
- Height: c. 42 cm
- Width: c. 22 cm
- Created: c. 3200 BC
- Discovered: 1898; Edfu, Aswan, Egypt
- Discovered by: James Quibell and Frederick Green
- Present location: Oxford, England, United Kingdom
- Identification: E3924

The Oxford Palette, also known as the Two Dog Palette or the Minor Hierakonpolis Dogs Palette, is an Ancient Egyptian cosmetic palette discovered in Hierakonpolis. It is part of the collection of the Ashmolean Museum in Oxford, United Kingdom.

The Palette was discovered by British archeologists James Quibell and Frederick W. Green, in what they called the Main Deposit in the Temple of Horus at Hierakonpolis, during the dig season of 1897–1898.

== Description ==
Carved in low relief, the obverse side of the palette features two African wild dogs at the top, two serpopards licking a gazelle framing a mixing circle, and Saluki hounds attacking ibexes at the bottom. It is the earliest known representation of a griffin-like figure in Ancient Egyptian art, which appears on its reverse side with comb-like wings. At the bottom of the reverse side, a jackal-headed figure wearing a belt or penis-sheath plays a flute.

== See also ==
- Narmer Palette
