= Confronted animals =

Decorative motif of two animals facing each other

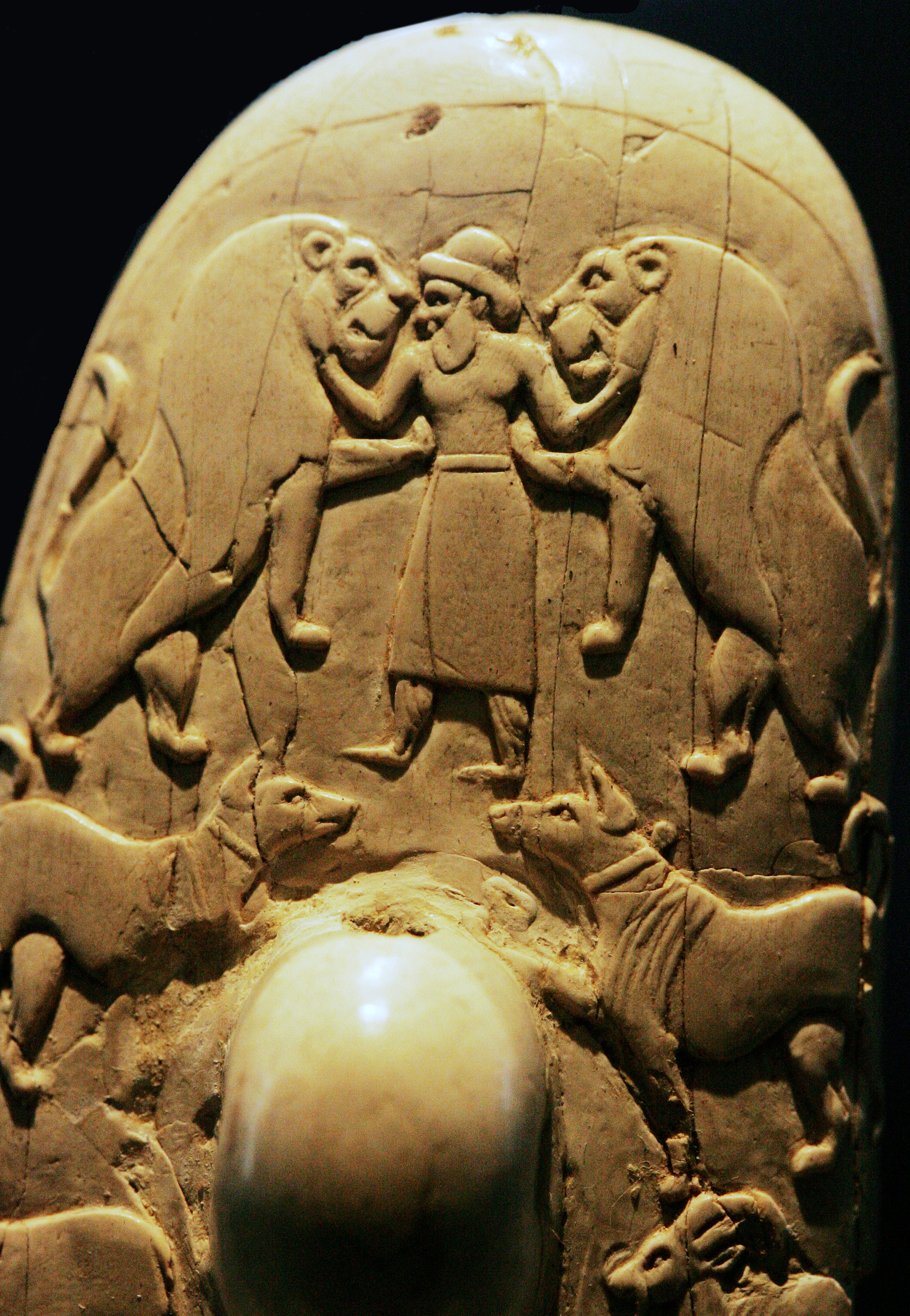
The Gebel el-Arak Knife. The reverse of the handle shows a Master of Animals motif: two confronted lions, flanking a central figure (note confronted dogs and other animals below)

Confronted animals (or confronted-animal as an adjective) is an ancient bilateral artistic motif where two animals face each other in a symmetrical pose. Anti-confronted animals is the opposing motif, with the animals back to back.

In ancient art, confronted-animal motifs often involve the Master of Animals, a central human figure between two confronted animals, often grasping them, and are probably part of a unified socio-cultural motif. A related motif in ancient art is known as the Mistress of Animals.

Bilateral symmetry is a dominant aspect of our world and strong representation of it with matching figures often creates a balance that is appealing in artwork.

It is thought that the iconography sometimes has ritual and religious associations; for example, the Lion Gate of Mycenae has a column between the protective, surmounted and confronted lionesses standing with two feet on the ground and two on the same base on which the column rests. The column is thought to represent a goddess, abstracted to avoid tabooed direct representation. Alternatively, the column has also been interpreted as symbolizing the entrance to the palace. The lions are thus guarding the entrance to the palace and the walled fortification simultaneously. The motif called the Tree of Life, where two confronted animals graze on a shrub or tree, is also very ancient.

== Examples from archaeology ==
=== Cylinder seals ===
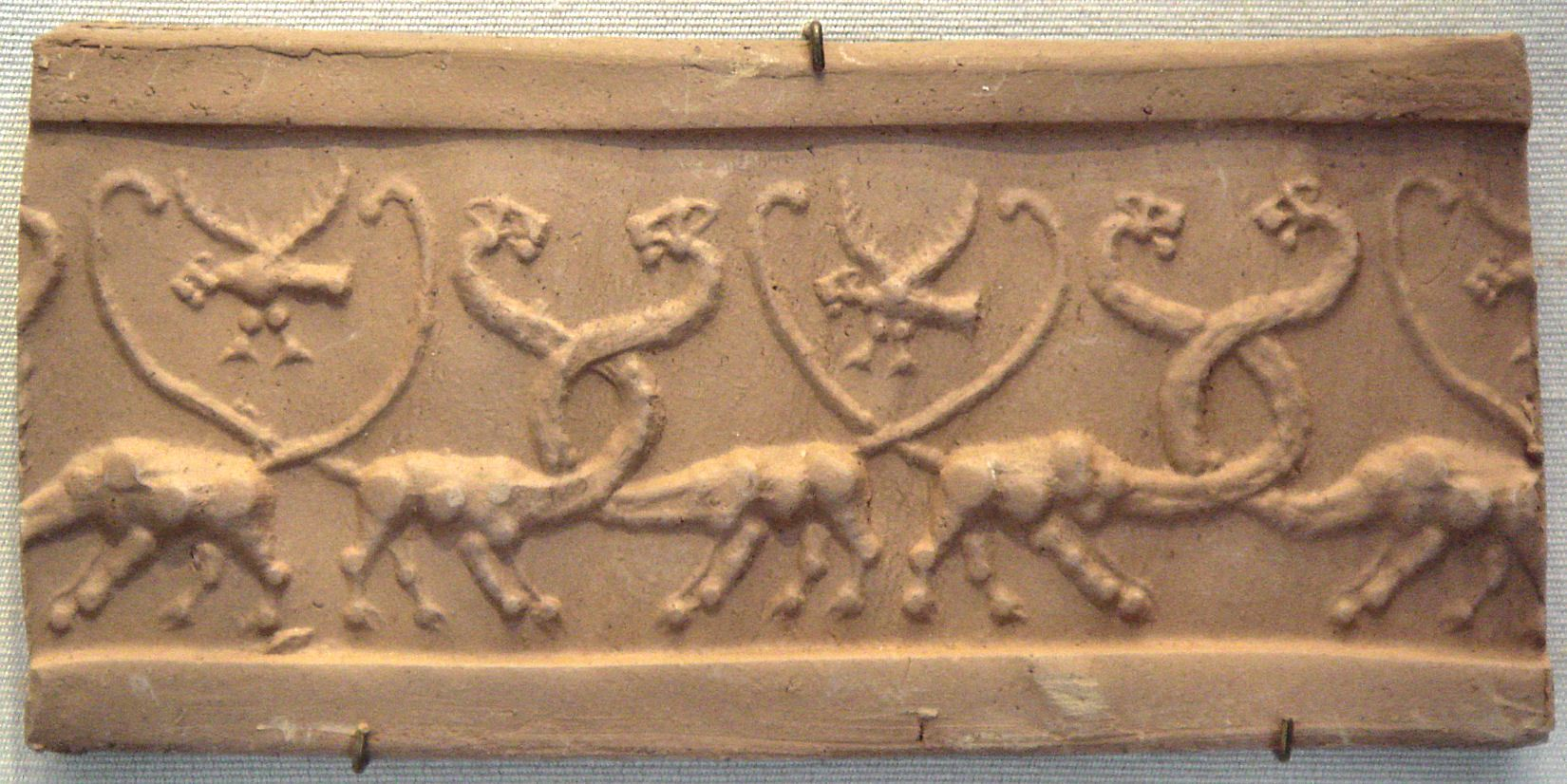
Cylinder seal of Uruk displaying a confronted-lioness motif sometimes described as a "serpopard" - 3000 BC - Louvre

Examples of confronted animals exist on Cylinder seals from Mesopotamia. Deities, or heroes grasping lionesses, cattle, griffins, or other, imaginary creatures are sometimes found.

Many cylinder seals involving confronted goats surrounding a central Tree of life on a 'cone' or 'mountain' platform share one common theme. Others may be thought of as deities holding the animals under their control.

Because cylinder seals are numerous and also come from pre-historical periods, back to the fourth or 5th millennium BC, themes are varied. Another Tree of life type of confronted animals cylinder seal has a "hero grasping water buffalo" and a "bull-man grasping lions", each between the animals; again, the central figure is the "Tree-of-Life" that often is interpreted as representing a goddess.

=== Confronted snakes ===
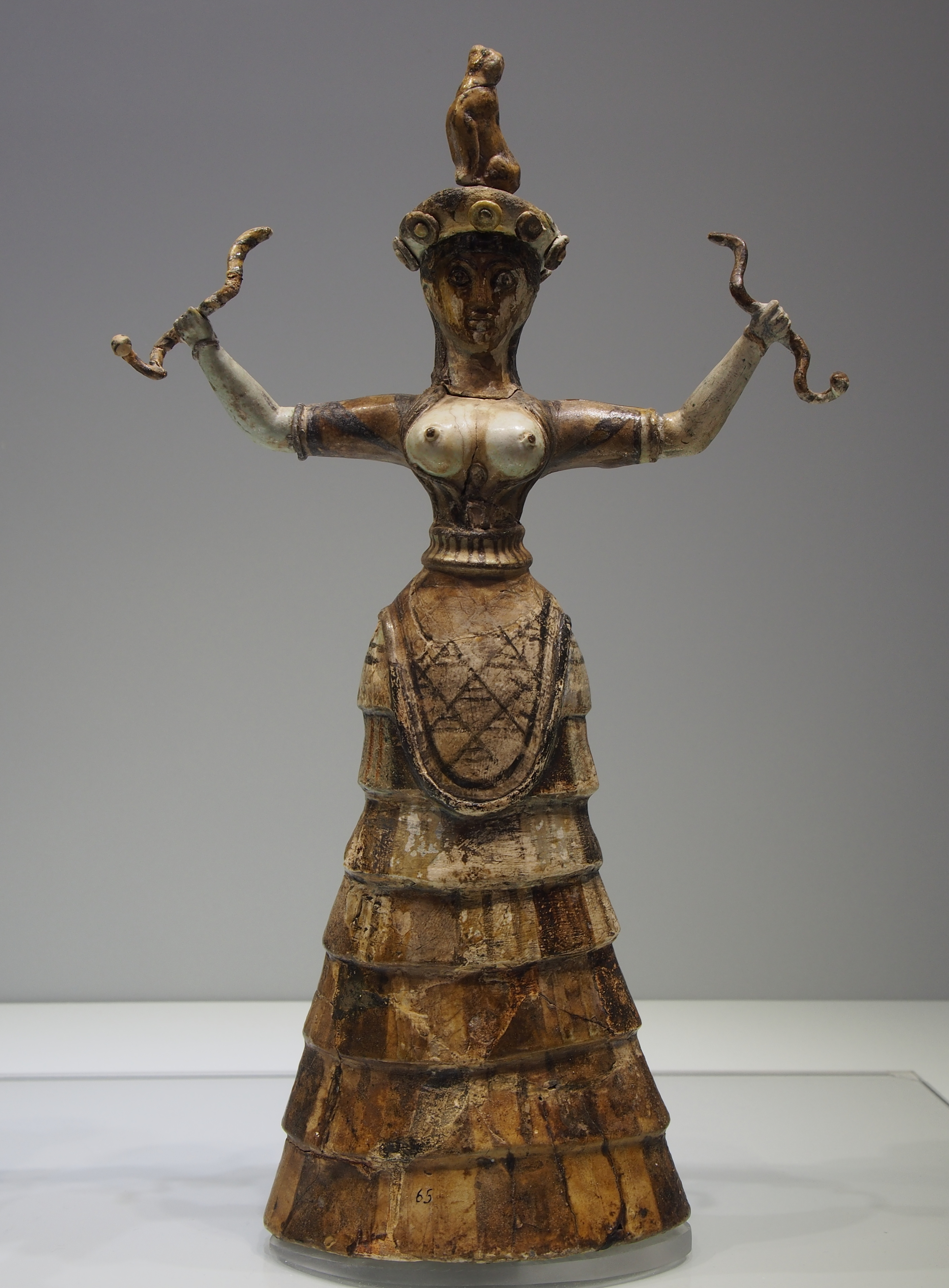
Minoan snake goddess figurine from Crete, holding confronted snakes, dated 1600 BC.

Confronted snakes are frequent images in many cultures from ancient times to historical periods. Often associated with religious ceremonies and deities, perhaps the most familiar figure known popularly from ancient times is the deity or priestess of Crete depicted holding up two confronted snakes on either side of her.

A chlorite vessel from the area of contemporary Baghdad, Iraq is displayed at this link. It depicts three pairs of confronted animals. Two confronted snakes are being held in the hands of the central figure; below the snake-pair are a pair of anti-confronted-lionesses (although they turn their heads to face each other their hind quarters are closely confronted), recumbent. The third similar pair of animals on this item are two anti-confronted bovines with a human or deity between also. Two tumbling lions and other animals are depicted to the right.

=== Narmer Palette ===
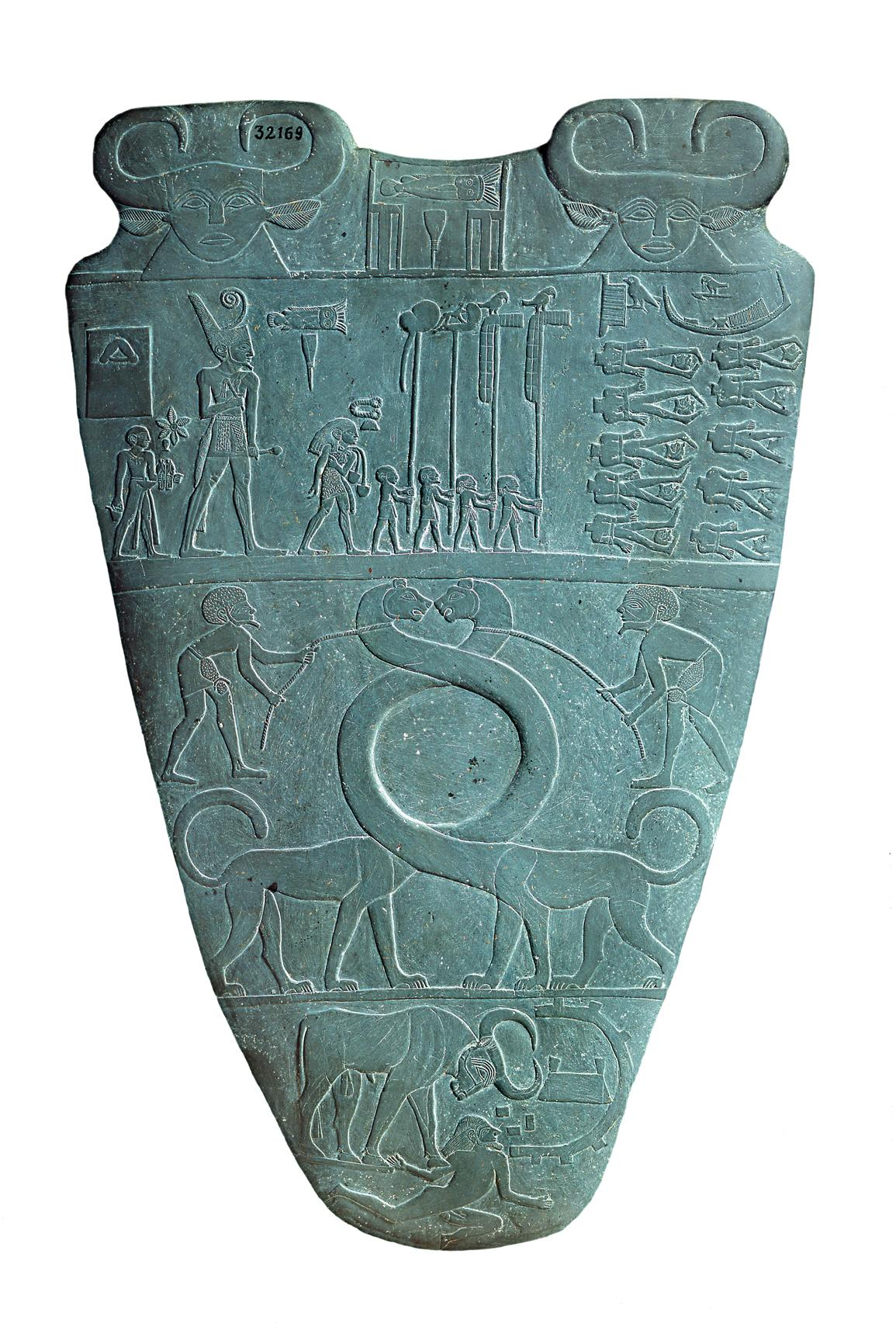
Narmer Palette with confronted lionesses, displayed in iconographic registers - Ancient Egypt c. 3,000 BC

The Narmer Palette, used to mix cosmetics in the receptacle on one side, has two confronted felines, sometimes called serpopards (because of their exaggerated long necks which look snakelike to some researchers) forming the receptacle. Close examination of the animals with the exaggerated, long necks supports identification as lionesses. The entire theme of the Narmer Palette, is about the pharaoh of the newly unified Ancient Egypt represented in two scenes, (palette obverse, palette reverse). On one side the pharaoh wears the crown of Upper Egypt and on the other, the pharaoh wears the crown of Lower Egypt. Thus, it is thought that the lionesses with their intertwining necks are representing two kingdoms, once separate, but now unified under one pharaoh. The lioness Bast had been the protective deity of one kingdom and the lioness Sekhmet of the other kingdom, equally important deities in each of the early Egyptian pantheons. Respectively, they were the special protectors of the pharaoh in each kingdom, who persisted as deities throughout the long history of unified Ancient Egypt. Eventually their roles diverged, however, with one becoming less of the protector and warrior deity and assigned other roles. Typically, many similar deities in the two kingdoms soon were merged, so the retention of both is thought to be the result of the long and strong tradition of each.

Examples of other confronted animals exist on many cosmetic palettes of Ancient Egypt that have been discovered. One palette has confronted-hippopotamuses; others include giraffes, geese, and other animals familiar to the Egyptians. Bilaterally depicted palm trees also are known as well on palettes.

=== Gebel el-Arak Knife ===
The reverse side of the Gebel el-Arak Knife handle, displayed at the top of the article, shows two powerful confronted lions, separated by a figure who is grasping them. Of note, the knob on the reverse shows the top end of the hole for a cord or rope, on the suspension lug; this knife may have been worn around the neck ceremonially.

=== Mycenae Lion Gate ===
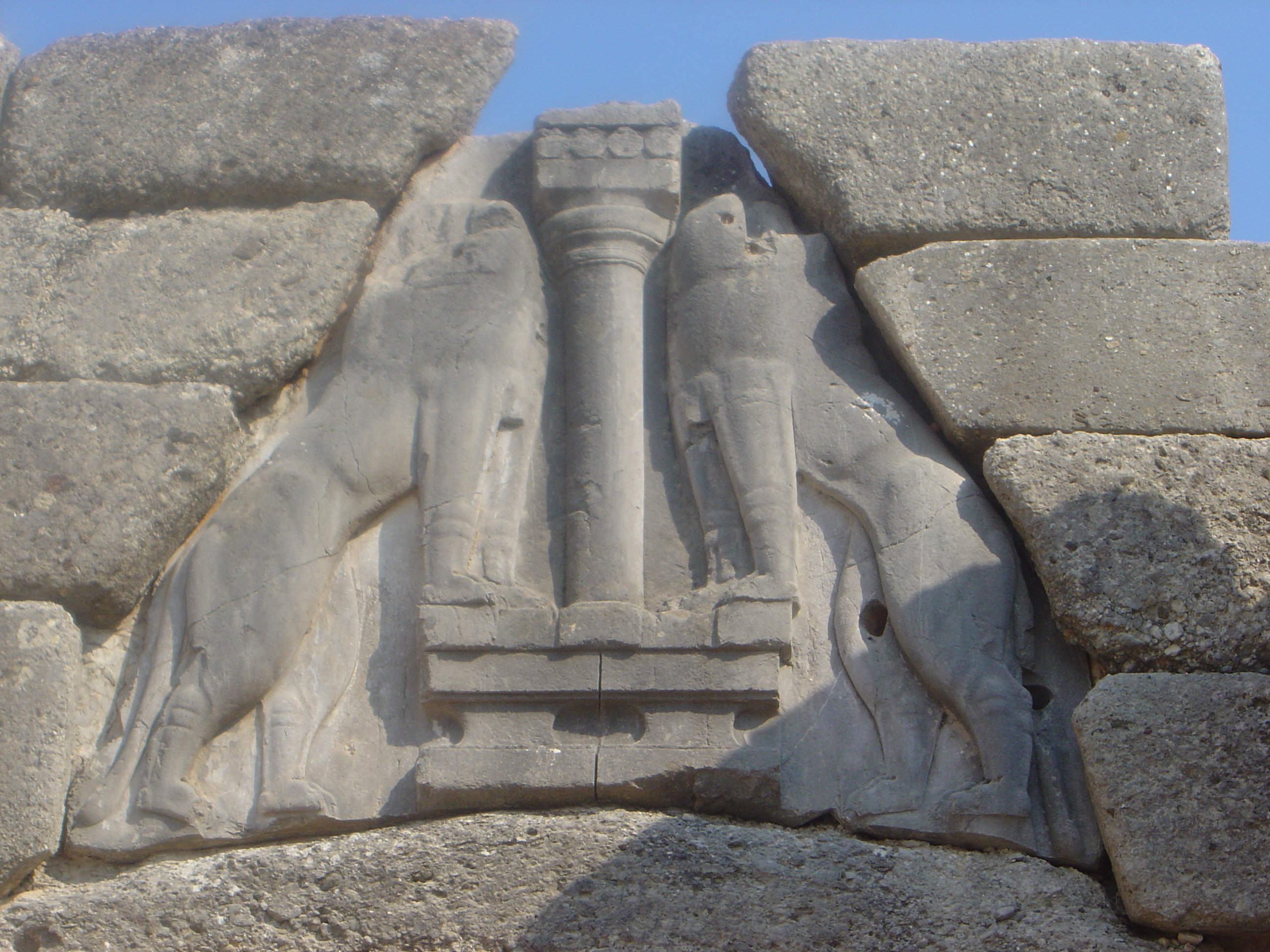
The Mycenae "Lion Gate" (detail) with two lionesses or lions that flank a central column

The gate to the citadel of Mycenae is shown to the right. It crowned the major entrance gateway to the ancient citadel that was the centre of the culture, Mycenaean Greece, that predated that of Greece, and is a well-known example of two confronted lionesses. Debate exists in research of this image, questioning whether these are leopards or lionesses confronted with a column between them that represents the deity, but the characteristic tufts at the end of the tails confirm the species. Many images of lioness related deities are depicted with heavier manes than typical for lionesses, but that may have been the result of attempts to interpretation of the species or, unfamiliarity with the atypical dimorphic differences within this feline species. Alternatively, George Mylonas believed lions were depicted, not lionesses.

=== Ancient Greek herald's staffs (kerykeia) ===
In ancient Greece, heralds functioning as private messengers or public criers were referred to as kerykes. The keryx has functions in political, military, judicional and religious matters. He was identified by his attribute, the herald's staff or kerykeion, in Latin caduceus. The attribute also offered him protection. Hermes, the messenger of the gods, also carries a kerykeion. Kerykeia were often donated to temples by private persons and on state occasions. They are also found in herald's graves, and identify the profession of the buried person.

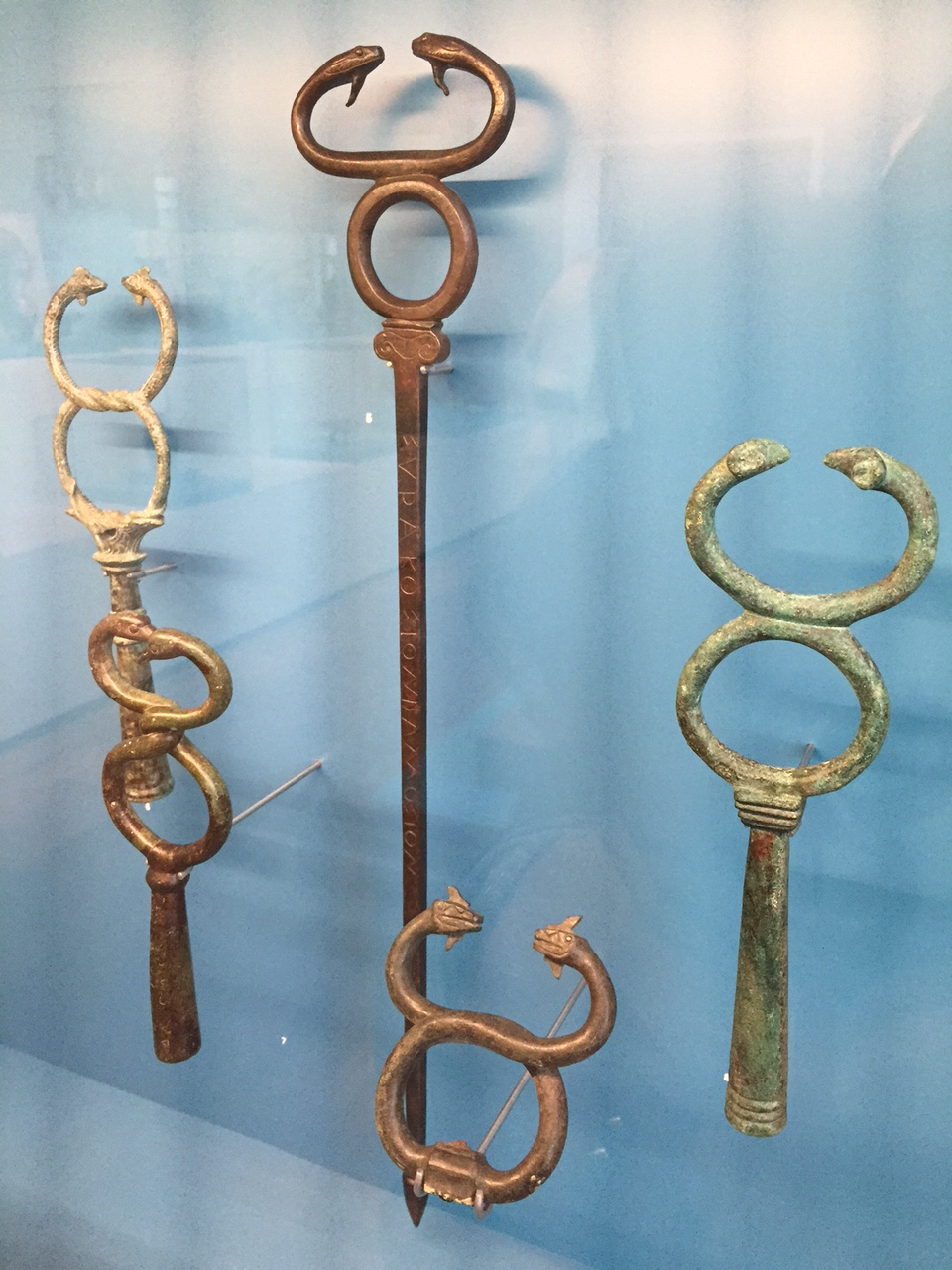
Ancient Greek herald's staffs (kerykeia), Greece, southern Italy, 5th century BC. Museum für Kunst und Gewerbe

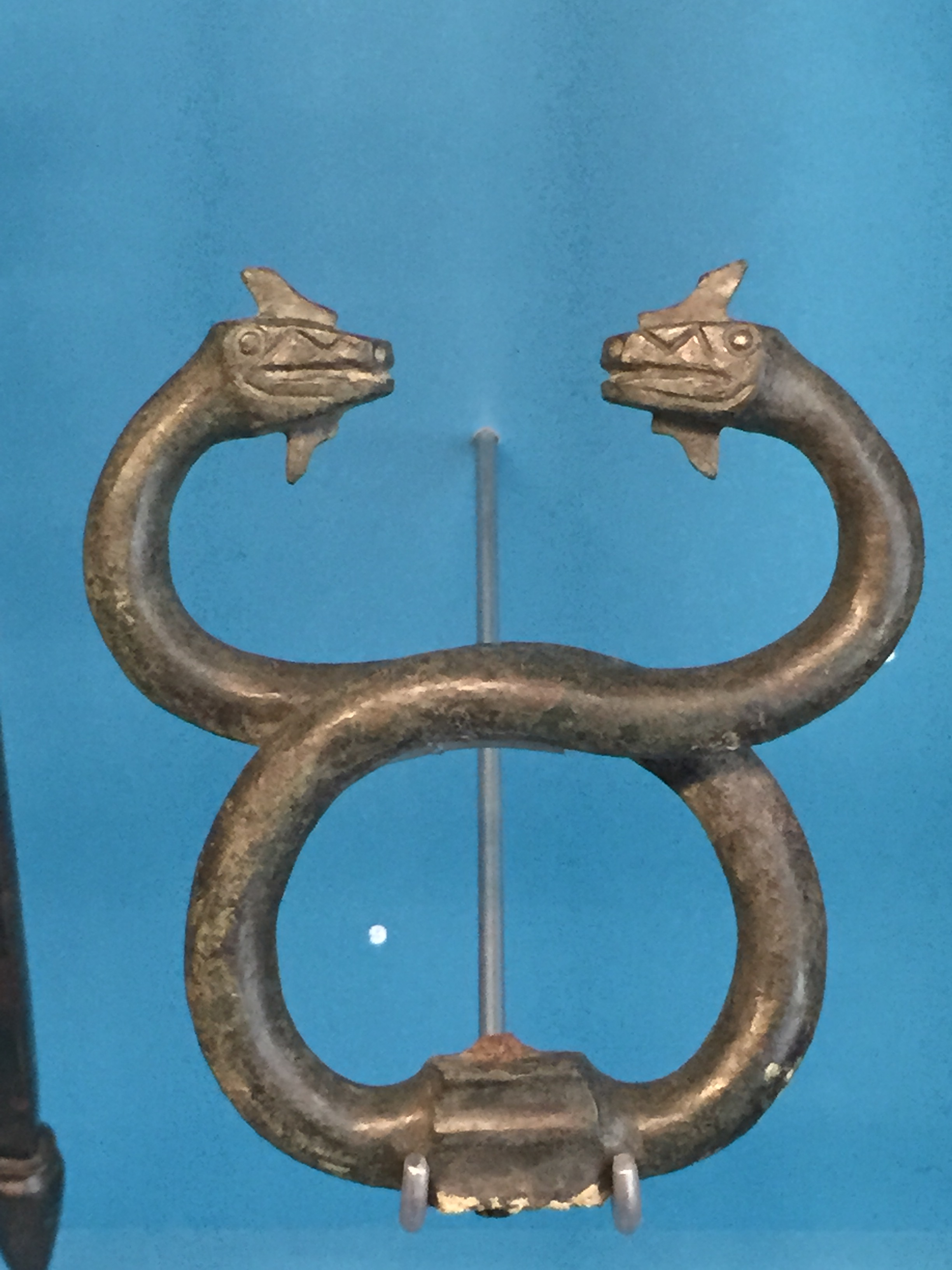
Ancient Greek herald's staff (kerykeion), Bronze, Sicily, 510-490 BC. Museum für Kunst und Gewerbe

=== Etruscan tomb mural ===
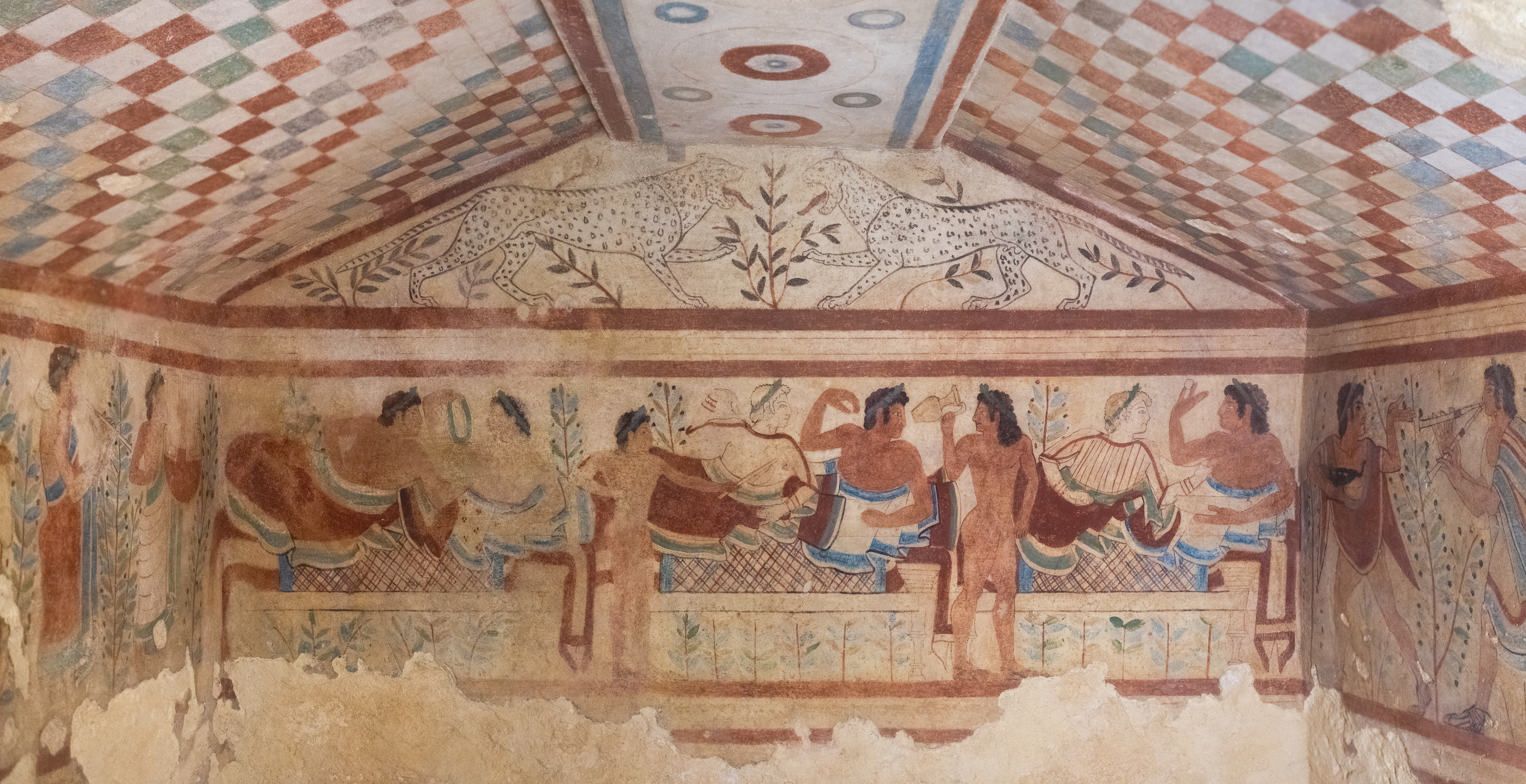
Confronted leopards protect a banquet in the afterlife where Etruscan couples dine and are served wine from the ewers held by servers before the seating - mural in a Tomb of the Leopards burial chamber - necropolis of Tarquinia - Lazio, Italy

Confronted leopards appear in a tomb found in Tarchuna (Tarquinia), or Tarchna Tarchnal, the chief of the twelve cities of Etruria, a district in what is described as the Etruscan civilization that existed in Italy from 1200 BC through the 100 BC. It appears in the earliest history of Rome, which was dominated by it until early in the 330s BC. This mural features confronted leopards providing protection for a banquet in the afterlife. Frequently felines, lionesses and leopards such as these are confronted with a tree, shrub, or column between them in murals from this culture. The Etruscans are thought to have migrated from the area of Troy, through Greece where they absorbed many cultural elements, to Italy where they founded their culture in prehistoric times.

=== European art ===
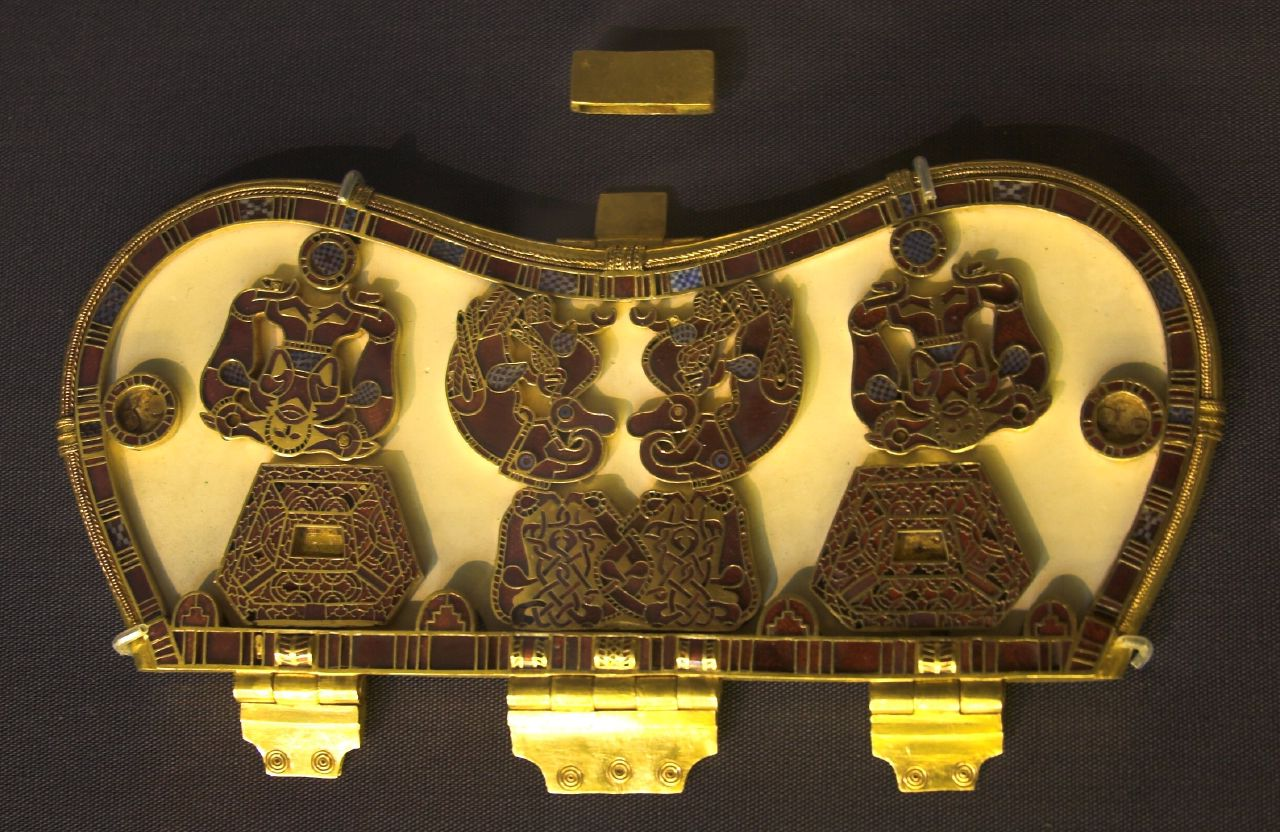
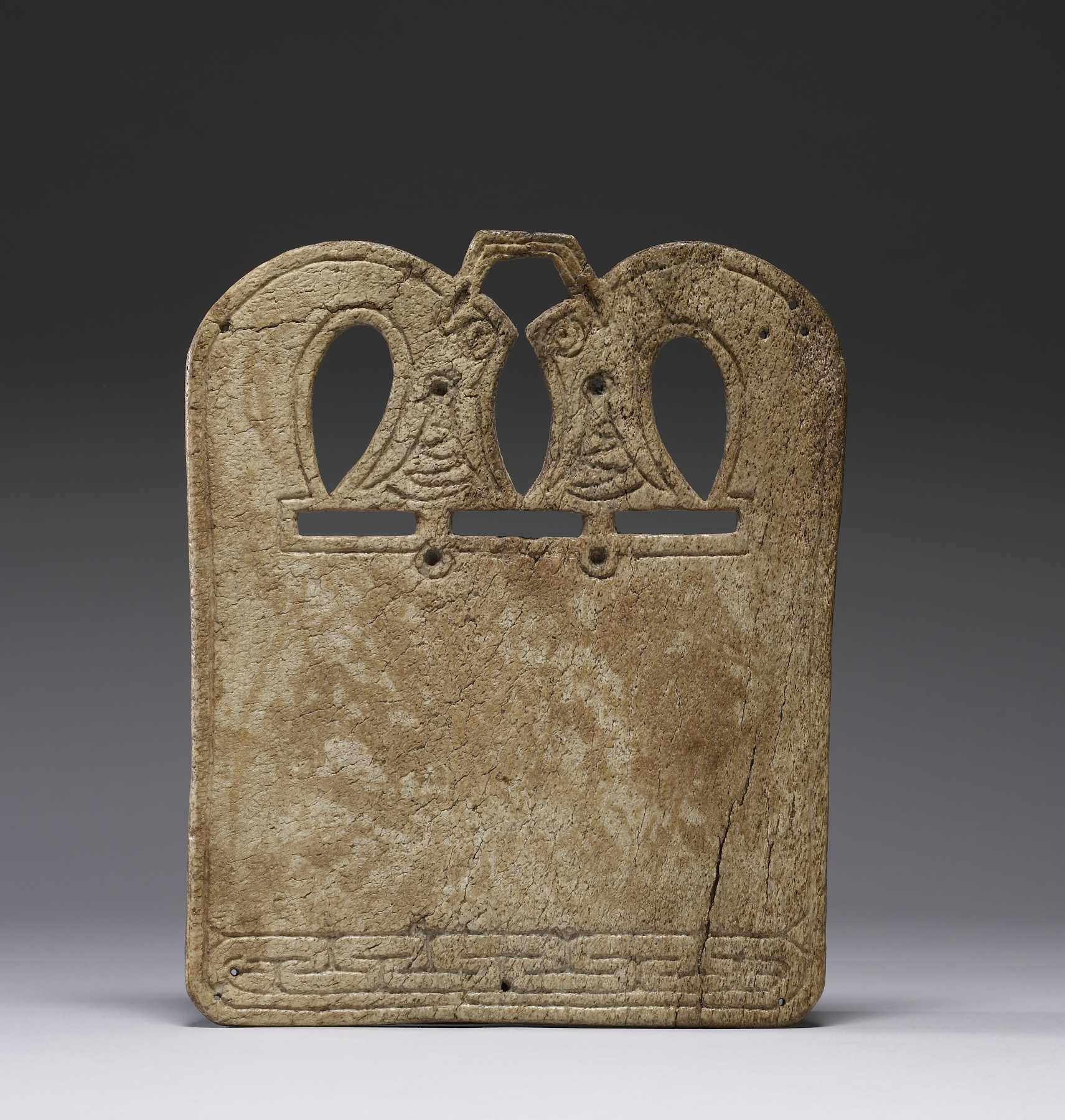
Left image: Purse-lid from Sutton Hoo, early seventh century AD.
Right image: Decorated plaque in whale bone, 8th-late 9th century, 22×18.3×0.8 cm (8.7×7.2×0.3 in)

In Europe, confronted animals are an important motif in animal style, or zoomorphic decoration, Insular art, and the Romanesque. In these contexts there may be little or nothing between the two animals, and the emphasis is on the pair themselves. Human figures are often treated in the same way, often mixed in with animals in decorative schemes - archers were especially popular in the Romanesque period.

The early Anglo-Saxon ship burial found in contemporary Great Britain at Sutton Hoo, from the seventh century AD, contains famous examples of Migration Period art. The Sutton Hoo purse-lid has three stylized confronted-animal pairs; the two side pairs, left and right, are identical, and have the animals in the person's clutched grasp. The central confronted animals are even more complex in theme.

Opposed animals are used in Insular art, the style of which is derived from a mixture of Celtic and northern European design traditions. Confronted animals, or animals intertwined in very intricate patterns, often depicted grabbing at each other to form the "gripping beast" pattern, are a main feature of some periods of Viking art. So intertwined are the animals, they are dissolved into pure ornament, and the individuals are barely discernable from each other. Confronted animals are also frequently seen in European Romanesque art, for example as decorative patterns in Romanesque architecture.

Supporters in heraldry, not always a matched pair, continue the theme, as do arms presented 'in courtesy' (with charges regarding each other).

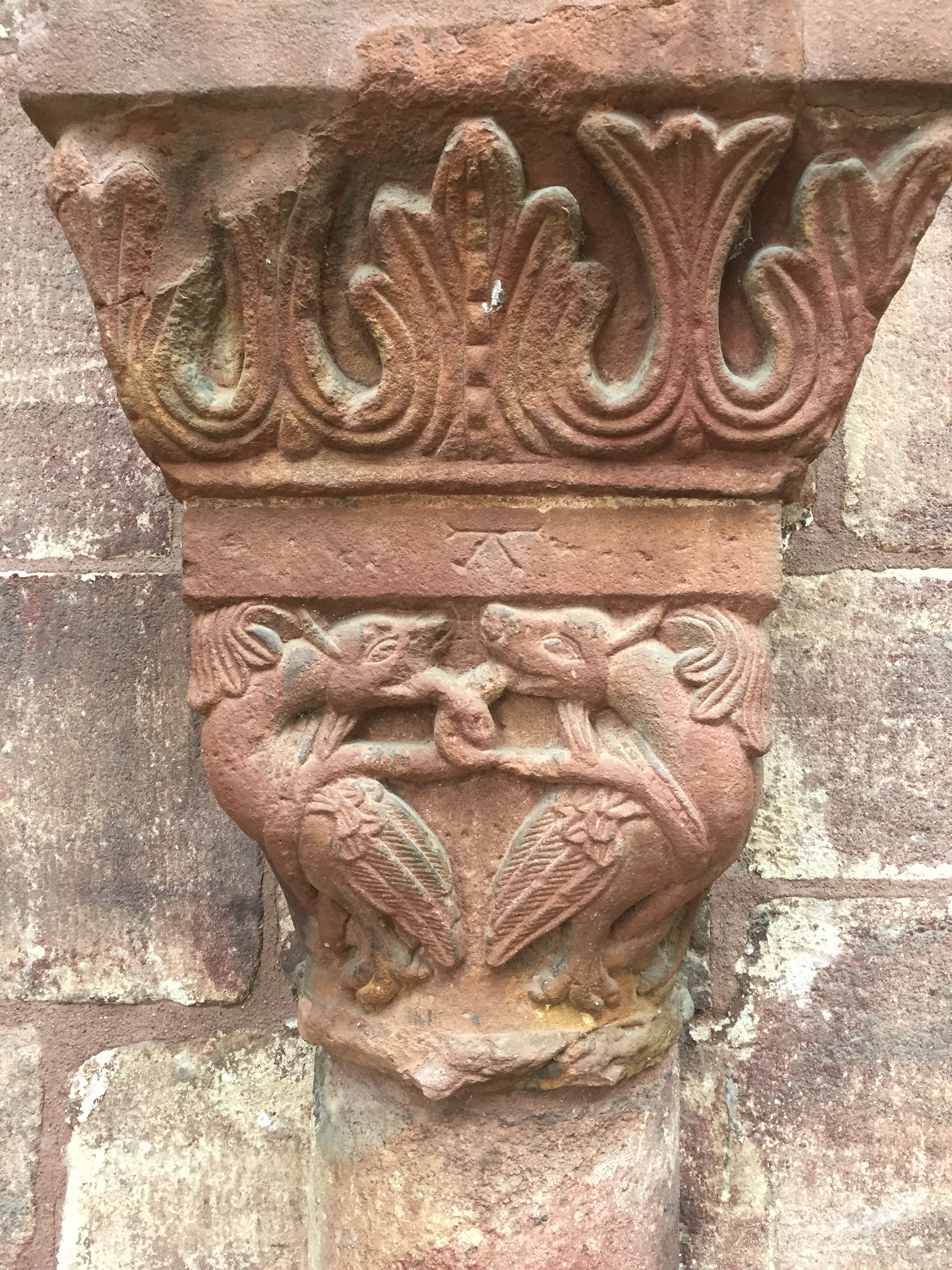
Romanesque capital, northern outside of the main apse of Basel Minster

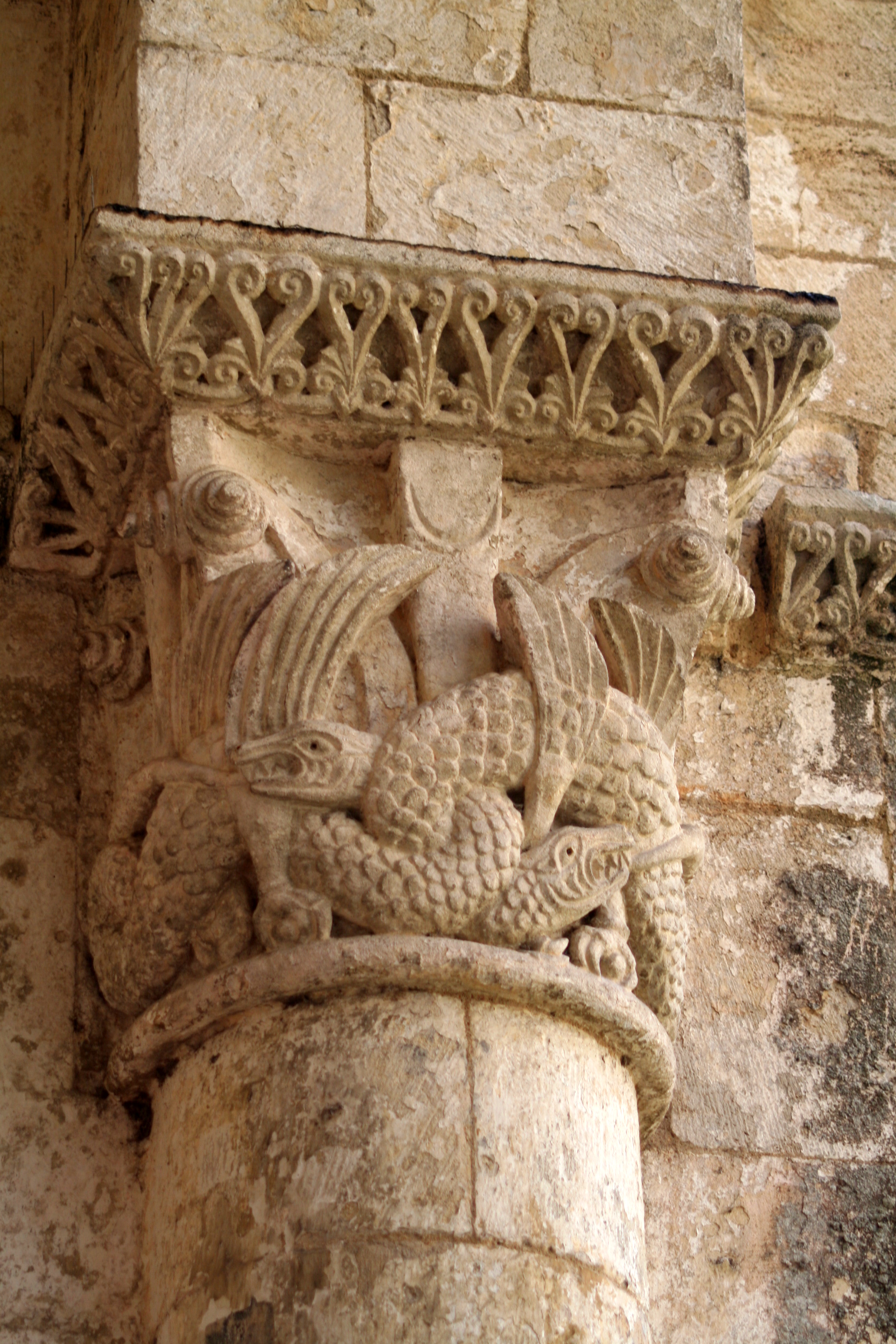
Capital decorated with intertwined beasts derived from Insular art. Grande-Sauve Abbey, France

The Royal coat of arms of the United Kingdom has a lion (England) and a unicorn (Scotland) as confronted supporters.

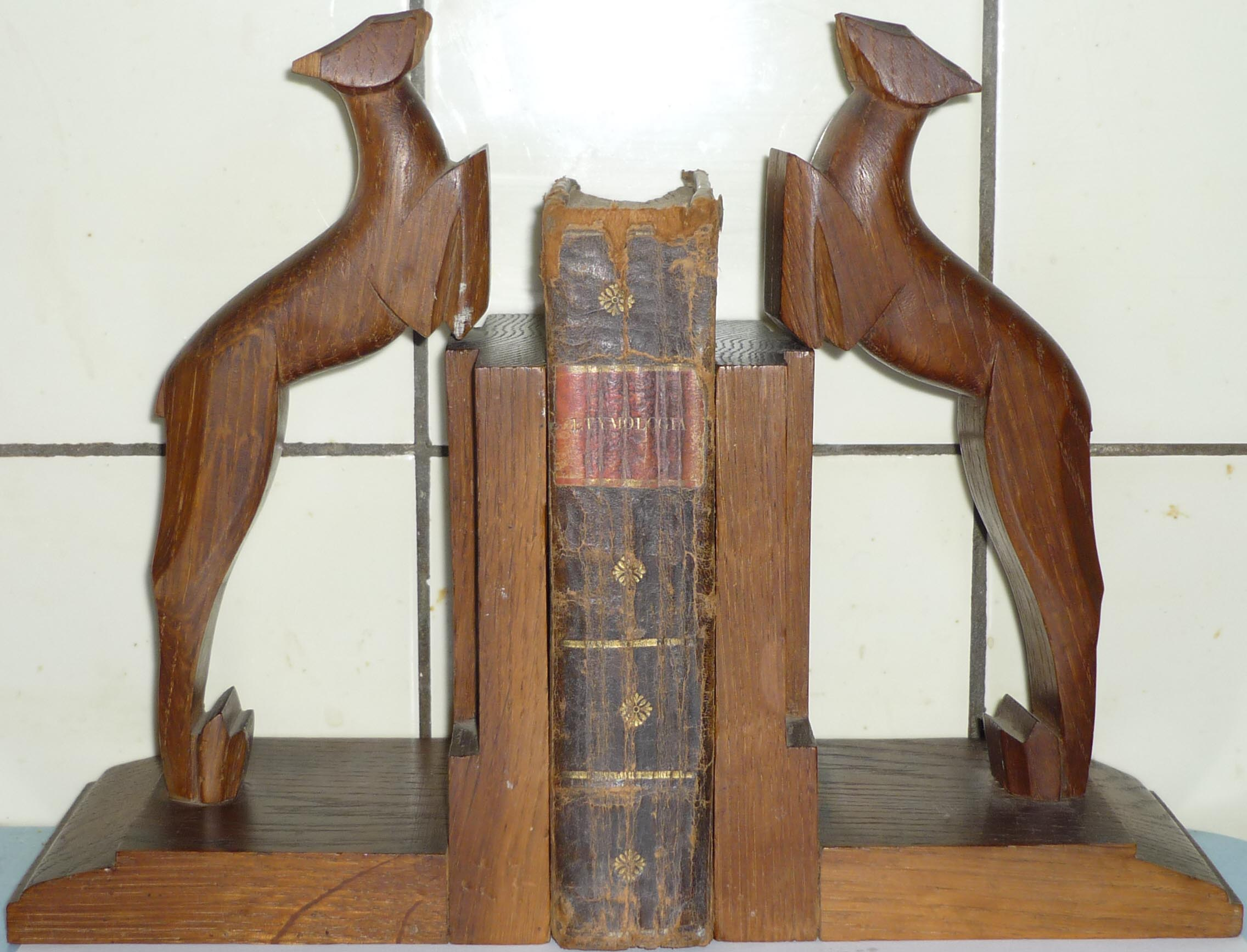
Bookends by René van Dievoet (1944).

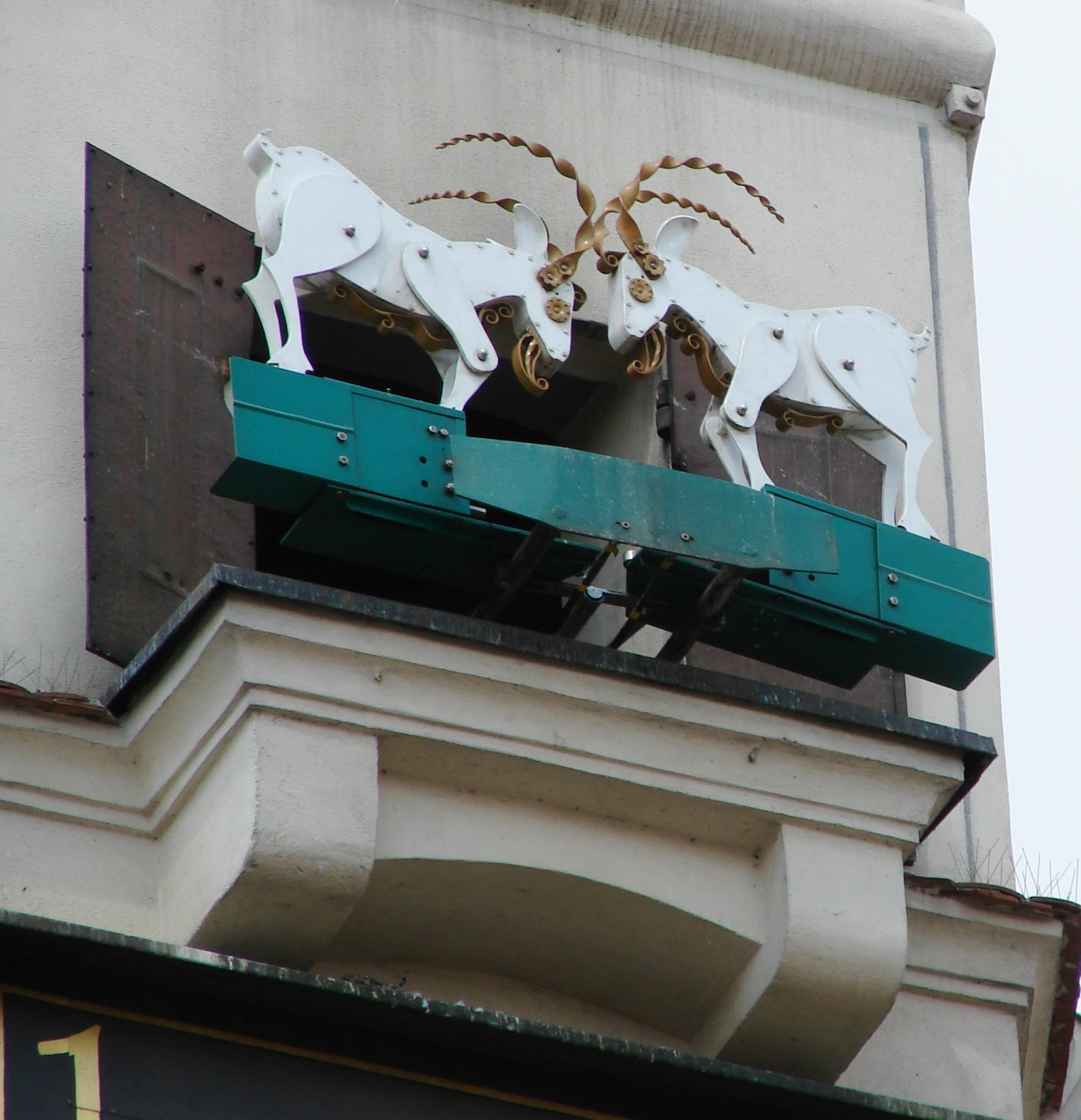
Poznań Goats

=== Asian art ===
==== Luristan bronzes, Anatolian "animal" carpets ====
Confronted-animal motifs are found extensively in Asian art and in textiles, including rugs, across Eurasia.

Few examples still exist of a special type of Oriental carpet, termed "animal carpets" because their main feature are confronted animals. Dated to the 13th–16th century, they represent carpets woven during the transition period between the late Seljuq and the early Ottoman Empire. Parallels were shown between the "opposed animal" and "latch-hook" motifs from woven pile rugs and the Lorestān bronzes. These are Early Iron Age bronze artifacts of various individual forms which have been recovered from Lorestān and Kermanshah areas in west-central Iran.

Carpet fragments discovered in Konya and Beyşehir in Turkey, and Fostat in Egypt were dated to the 13th century, which corresponds to the Anatolian Seljuq Period (1243–1302). Rows of horned quadrupeds placed opposite to each other, or birds beside a tree can be recognized on some of these fragments.

A traditional Chinese motif, the fight between phoenix and dragon, is seen in an Anatolian carpet now displayed at the Pergamon Museum, Berlin, and radiocarbon dated to the mid 15th century. The Chinese motif was probably introduced into Islamic art by the Mongols during the thirteenth century. Another animal carpet showing two medallions with two birds besides a tree was found in the Swedish church of Marby.

Since 1988, seven more carpets of the animal type have been found. They survived in Tibetan monasteries and were removed by monks fleeing to Nepal during the Chinese cultural revolution. One of these carpets was acquired by the Metropolitan Museum of Art which parallels a painting by the Sienese artist Gregorio di Cecco: "The Marriage of the Virgin", 1423. It shows large confronted animals, each with a smaller animal inside. An almost complete animal carpet is now at the Museum of Islamic Art, Doha.

"Animal carpets" were also depicted in Italian paintings of the 14th and 15th century, and thus represent the earliest Oriental carpets shown in Renaissance paintings.

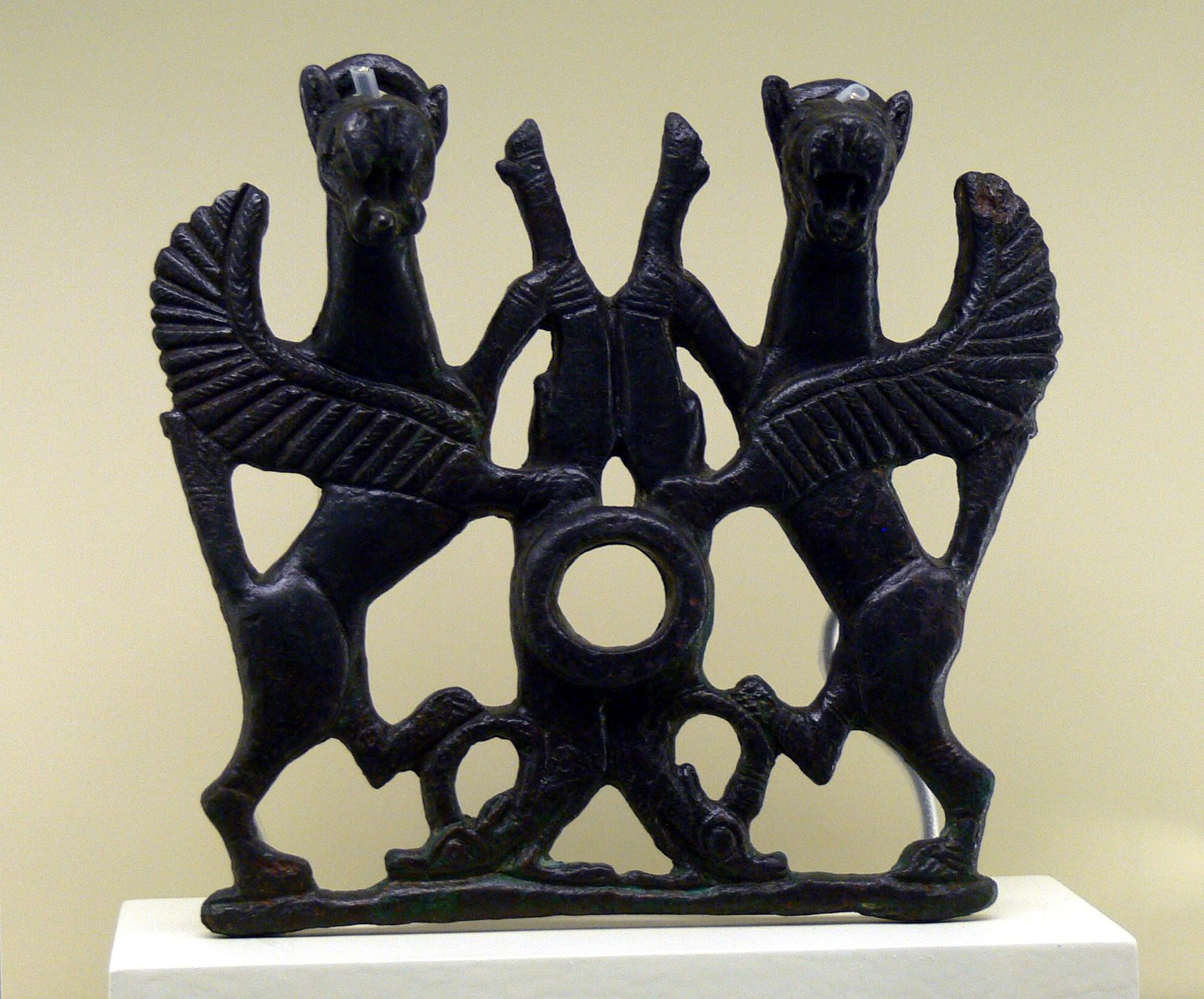
Luristan bronze griffins, 9-7th century BC, Museum of Ancient Near East, Berlin.

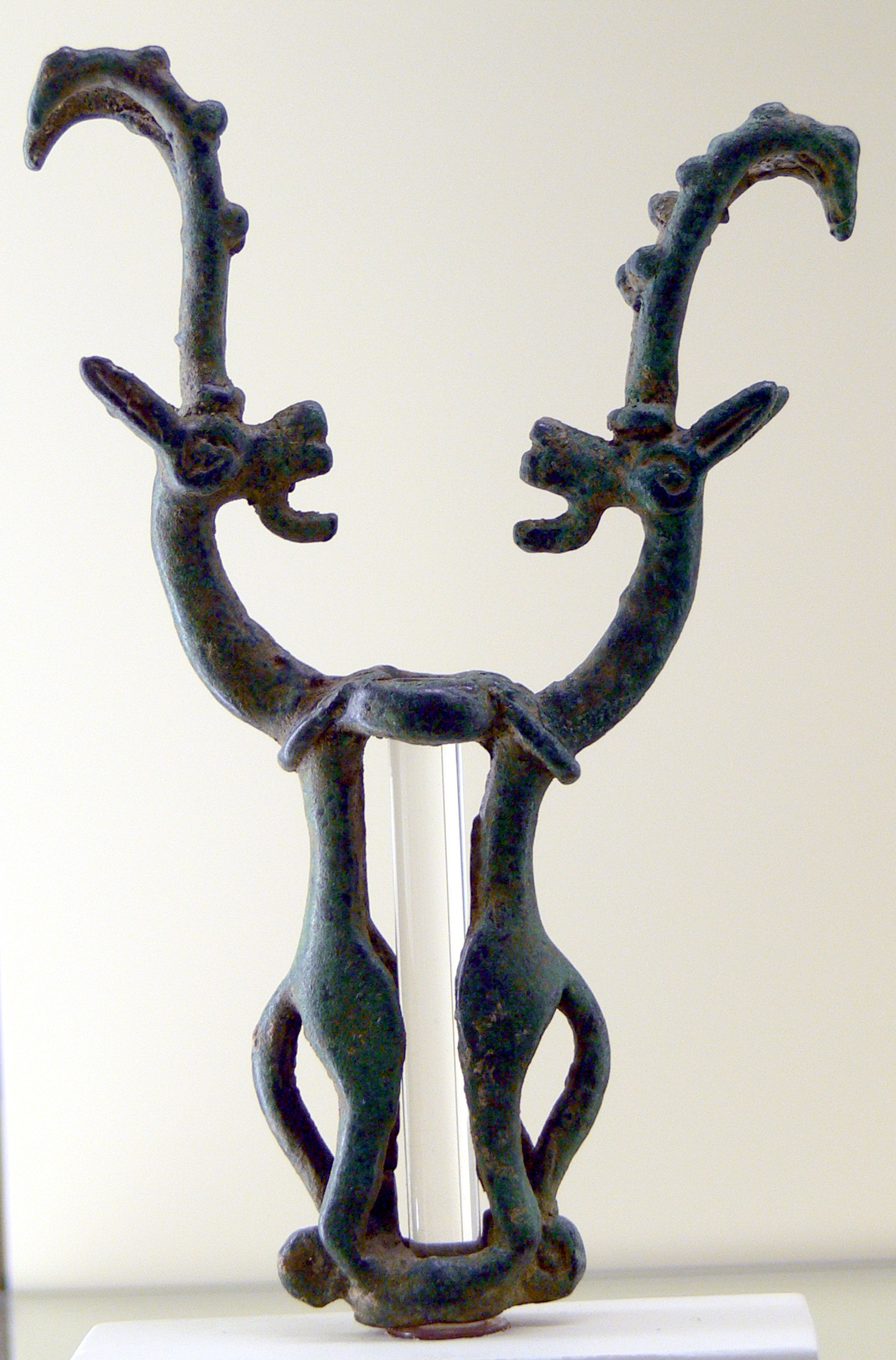
Luristan bronze ibexes, 9-7th century BC, Museum of Ancient Near East, Berlin.

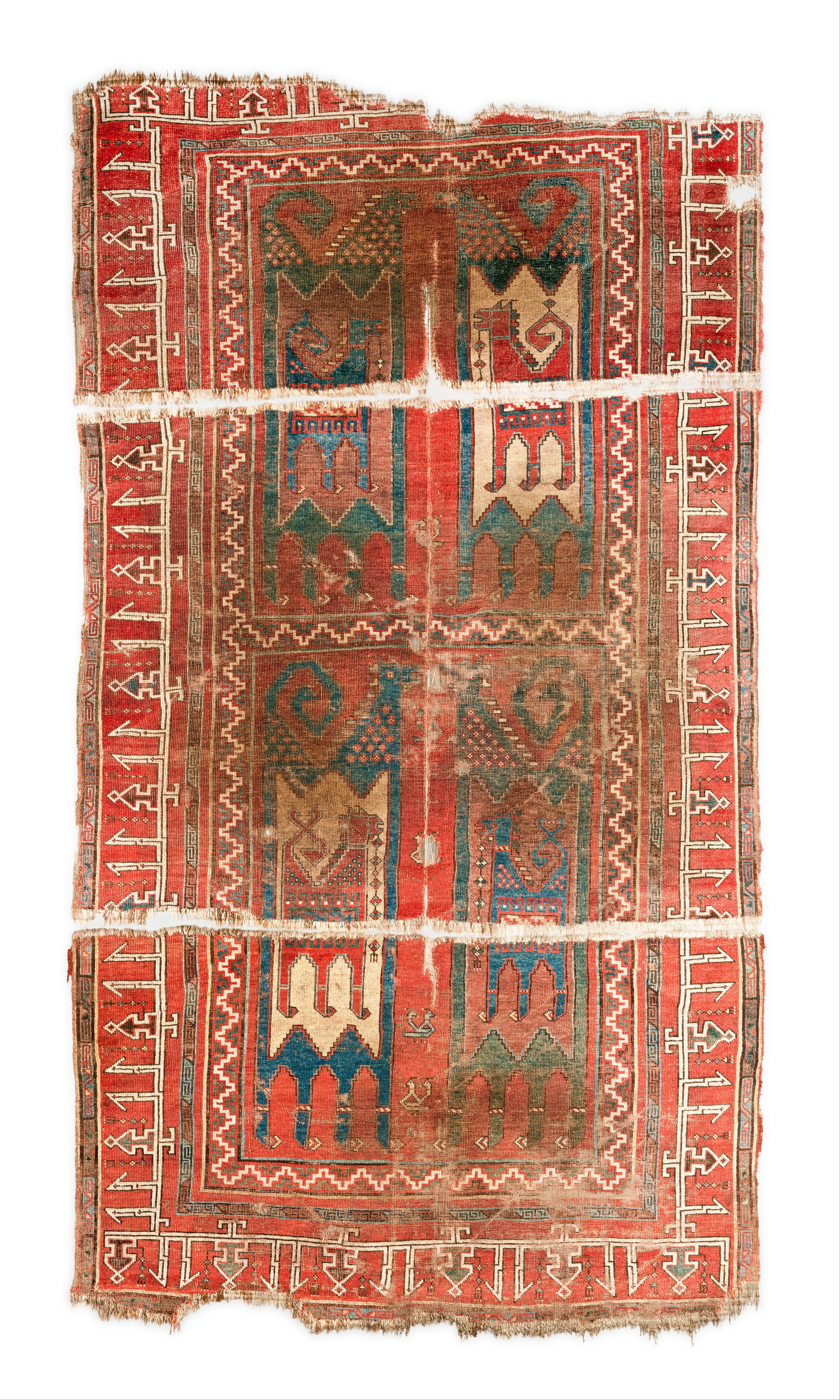
Animal carpet, Turkey, dated to the 11th–13th century, Museum of Islamic Art, Doha

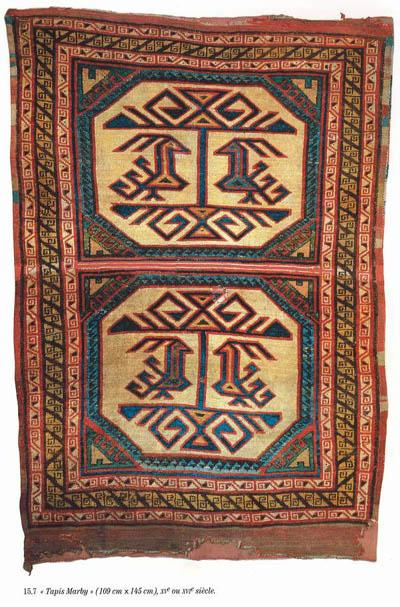
Animal carpet, around 1500, found in Marby Church, Jämtland, Sweden. Wool, 160 cm x 112 cm, Swedish History Museum, Stockholm

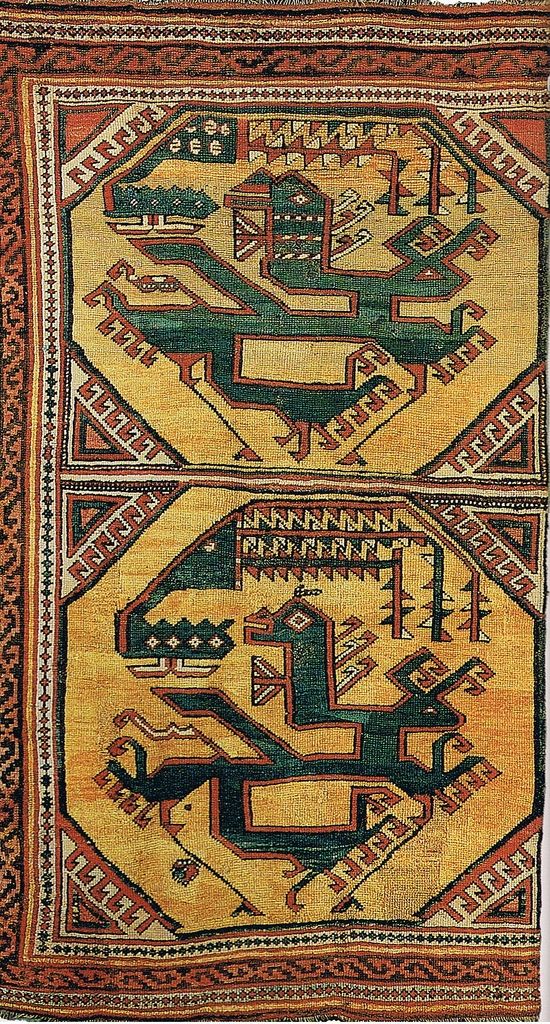
Phoenix and Dragon carpet, 164 x 91 cm, Anatolia, circa 1500, Pergamon Museum, Berlin

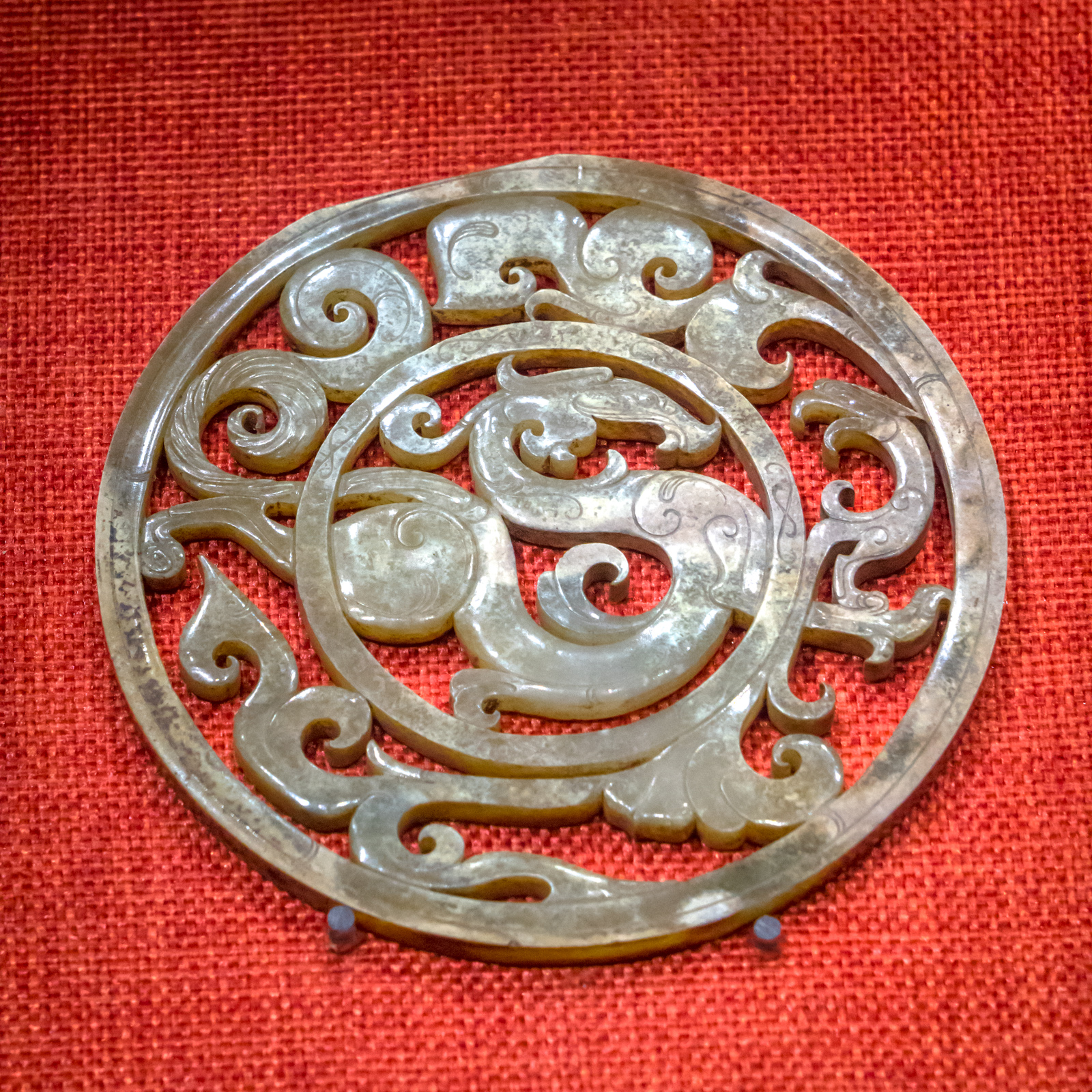
Jade Openwork Disc with Dragon and Phoenix, China, 2nd century BC, Museum of the Mausoleum of the Nanyue King

=== Native North American Art ===
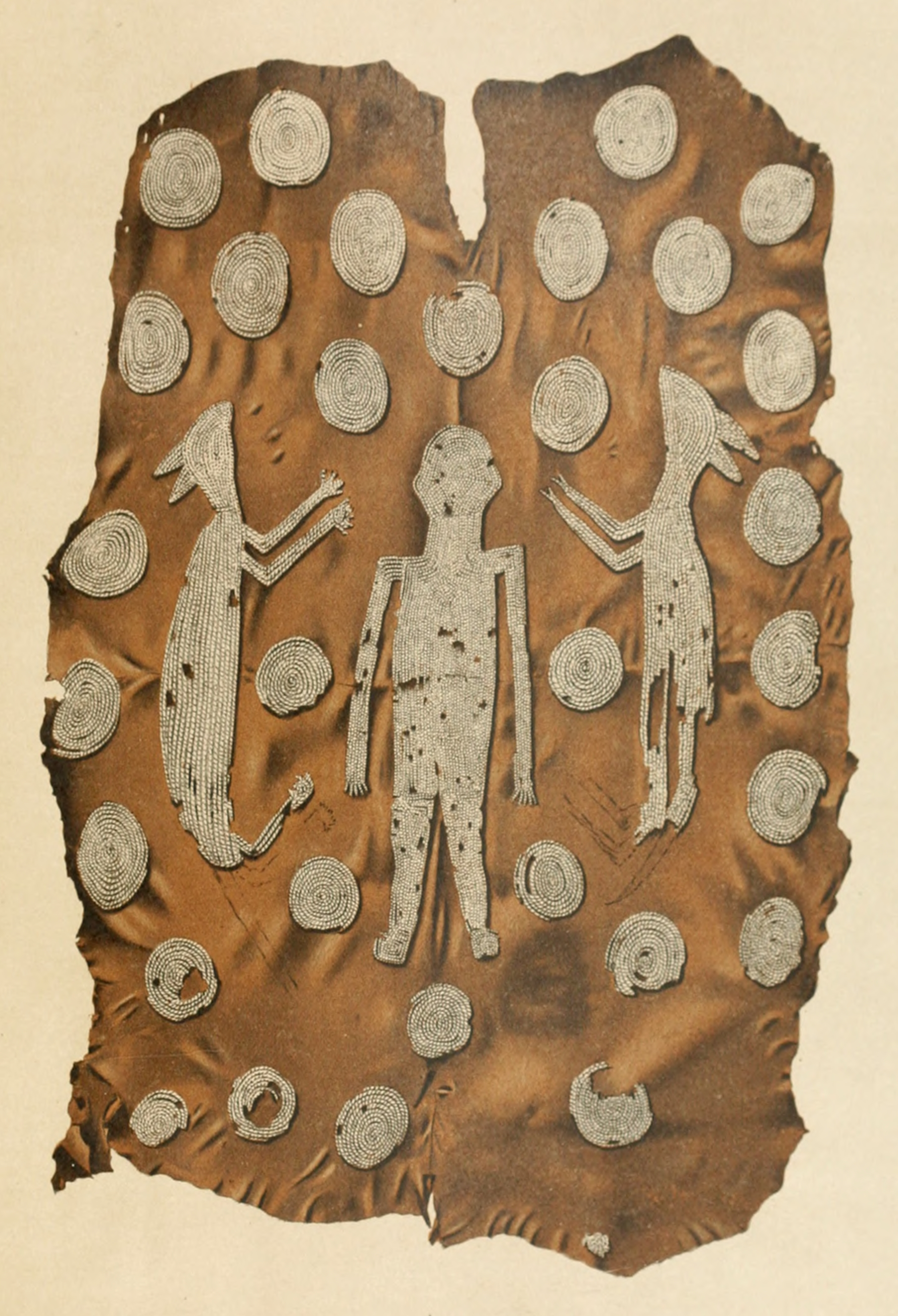
Lithograph of Powhatan's Mantle

"Powhatan's Mantle" is a cloak of deerskin, which originally belonged to a Native American of high social status. Its decoration consists of shell beadwork, depicting a central standing human figure flanked by two upright, opposed quadrupeds and surrounded by 34 discs. The two animals resemble one another in terms of their overall outline, but their tails and paws differ. The left-hand animal has a long tail and round paws with five articulated digits. The right-hand animal has a shorter tail, and its legs end in cloven hoofs. Historically, this artwork was believed to have belonged to Powhatan, who was the Mamanatowick of the Powhatan Confederacy, an Confederacy of Algonquian-speaking Virginia Indians in the Tidewater region of Virginia at the time English settlers landed at Jamestown in 1607. "Powhatan's Mantle" is one of the earliest North American artifacts to be collected by Europeans that still survives today.

== See also ==
- Book of Kells
- Tierwirbel
- Attitude (heraldry)
- Master of Animals
- Supporter
