= Serpopard =

Mythical animal known from ancient Egyptian and Mesopotamian art

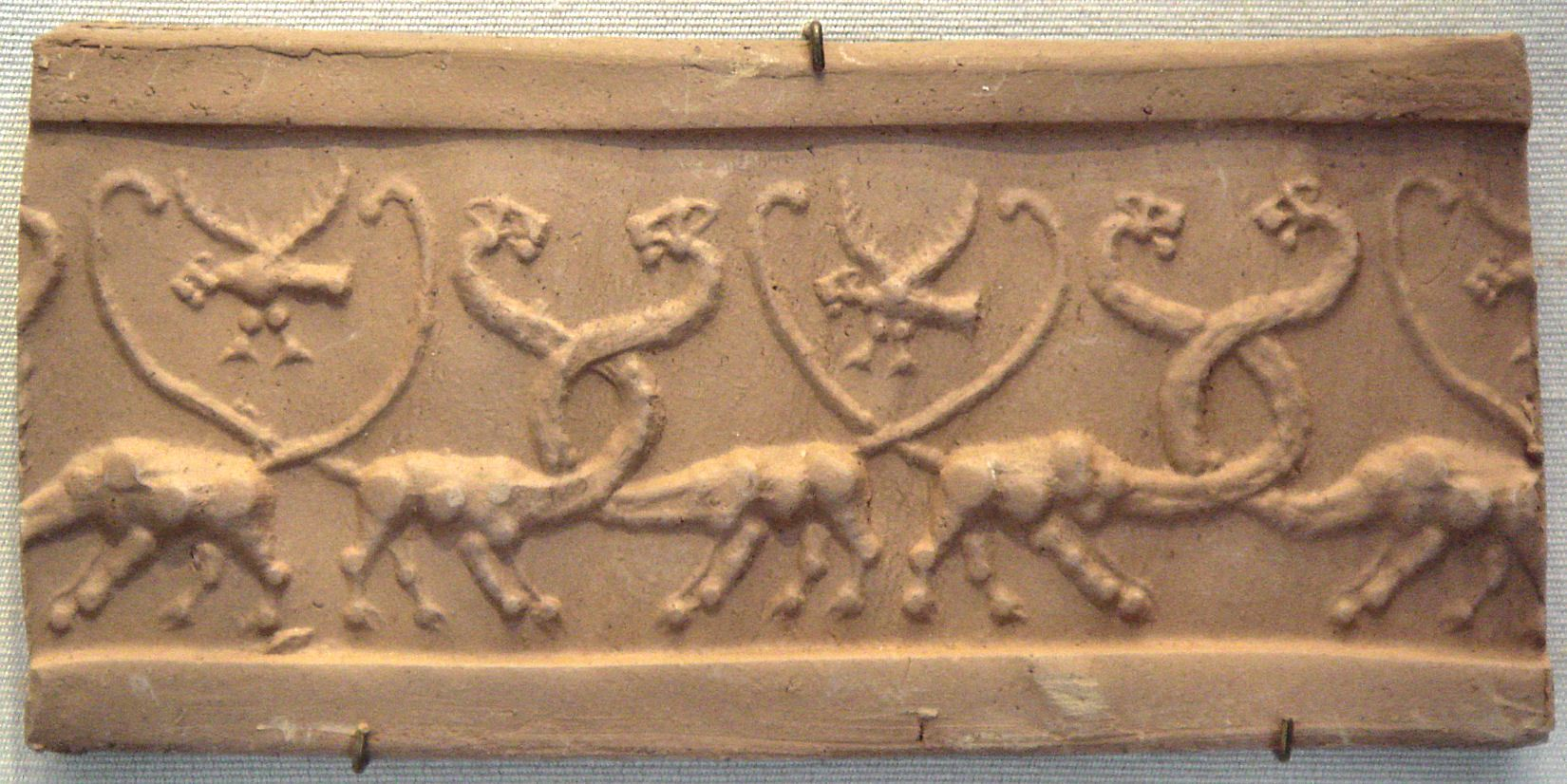
- Modern impression. This design is also sometimes qualified as a monstrous lioness. Louvre

Origin
- Country: Ancient Egypt and Mesopotamia

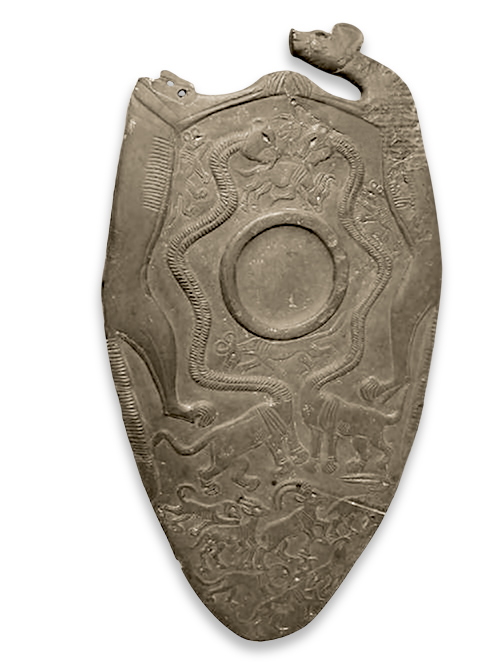
Oxford Palette from Hierakonpolis. Ashmolean Museum.

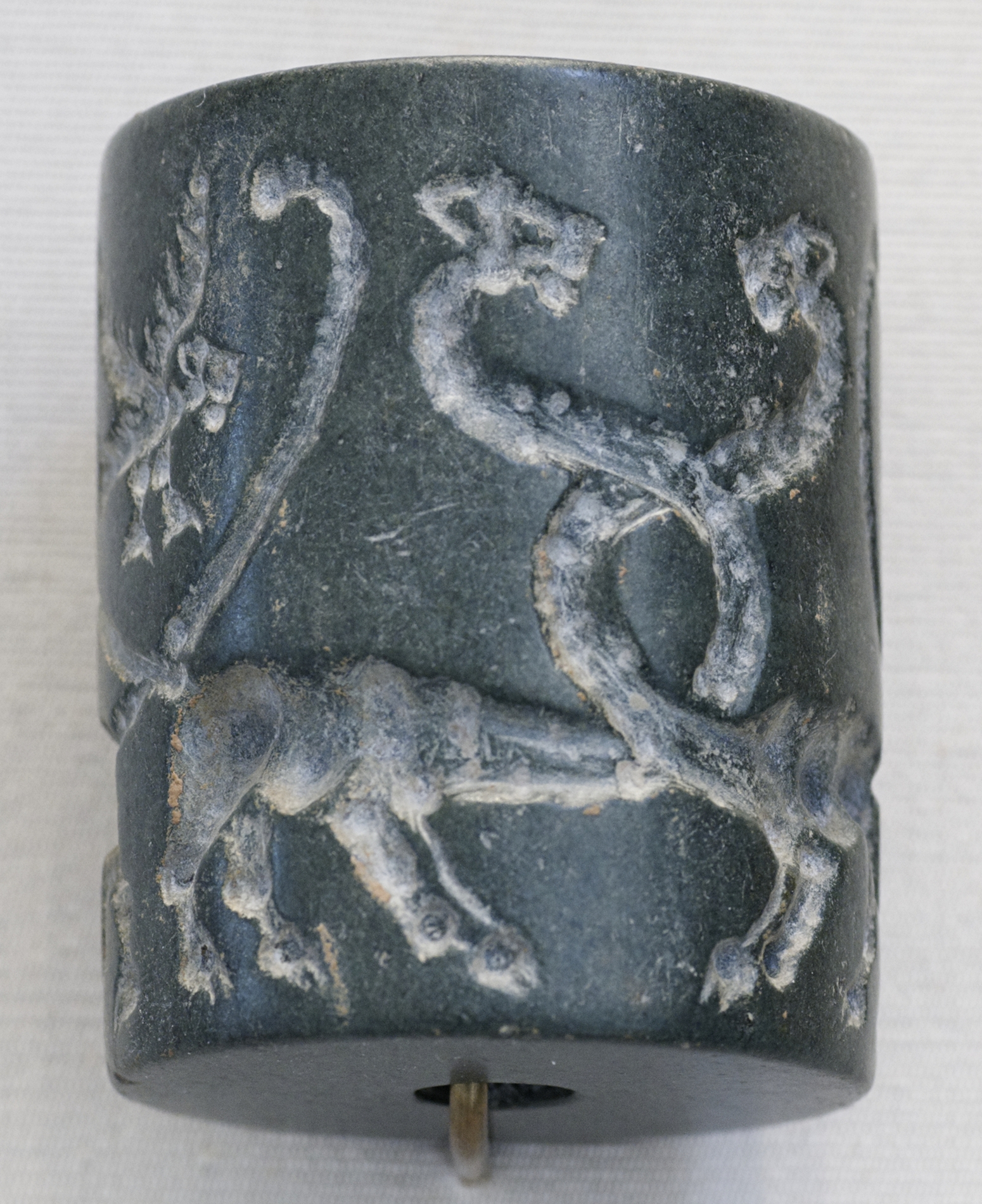
3000 BC cylinder seal of Uruk with serpopard design.

The serpopard (also known as monstrous lion) is a mythical animal known from ancient Egyptian and Mesopotamian art. The word "serpopard" is a modern coinage. It is a portmanteau of "serpent" and "leopard", derived from the interpretation that the creature represents an animal with the body of a leopard and the long neck and head of a serpent. However, they have also been interpreted as "serpent-necked lions". There is no known name for the creature in any ancient texts.

== Images ==
The image is featured specifically on decorated cosmetic palettes from the Predynastic period of Egypt, and more extensively, as design motifs on cylinder seals in the Protoliterate period of Mesopotamia (circa 3500–3000 BC). Examples include the Narmer Palette and the Oxford Palette. The cylinder seal of Uruk (image above) displays the motif very clearly. Typically, two creatures are depicted, with their necks intertwined. They are also occasionally depicted on birth tusks (also known as amuletic wands). One example is an amuletic wand held in the British Museum's collections.

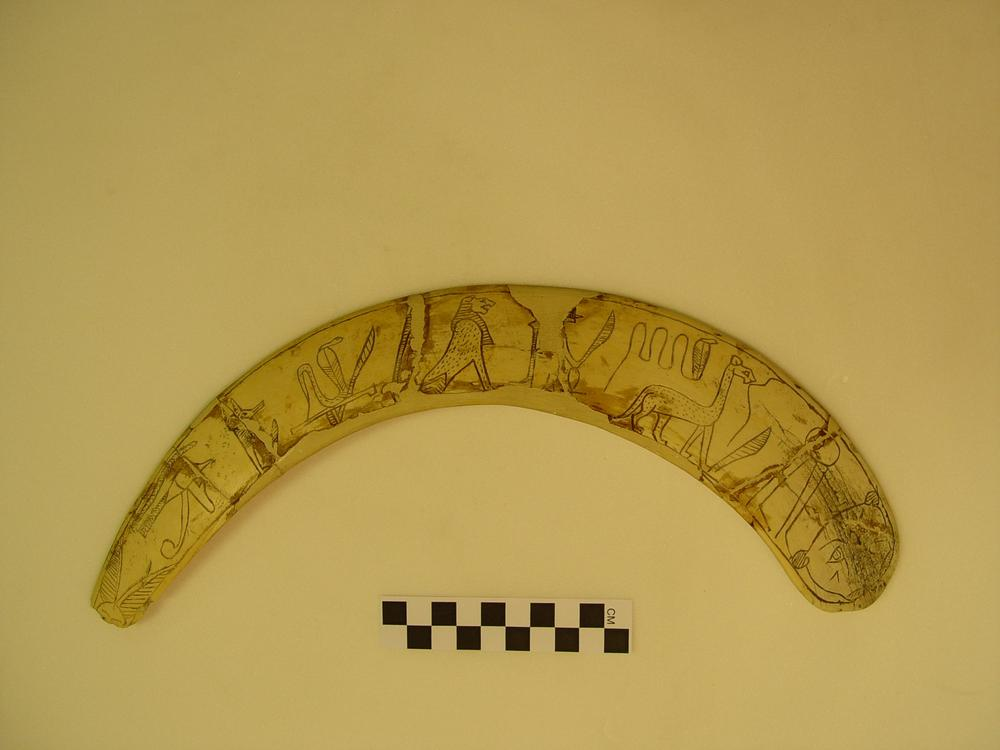
Amuletic Wand with serpopard, Middle Kingdom. British Museum.

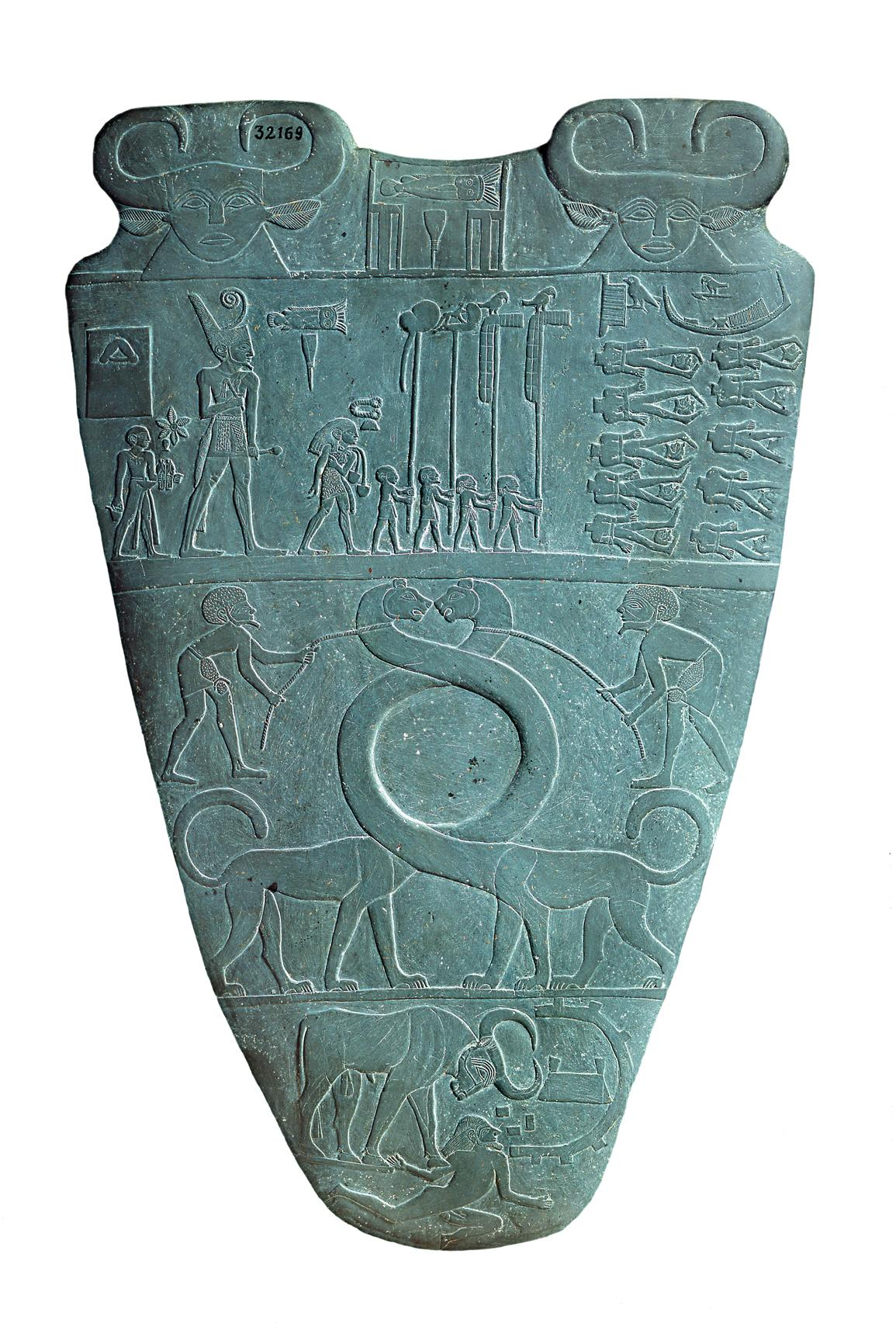
Narmer Palette with central depression for mixing cosmetics. (3200–3000 BC)

== Interpretations ==
The image generally is classified as a feline, and with close inspection resembles an unusually long-necked lioness. It bears the characteristic tuft of the species at the end of the tail, there are no spots, the round-eared head most closely resembles the lioness rather than a serpent, because serpents do not have ears, and there are no typical serpent features such as scales, tongue, or reptilian head shape.

It has been suggested that in Ancient Egyptian art the serpopard represents "a symbol of the chaos that reigned beyond Egypt's borders", which the king must tame. They are normally shown conquered or restrained, as in the Narmer Palette, or attacking other animals. But in Mesopotamian art they are shown in pairs, with intertwined necks.

Mesopotamian use of these "serpent-necked lions" and other animals and animal hybrids is seen by some scholars as "manifestations of the chthonic aspect of the god of natural vitality, who is manifest in all life breaking forth from the earth".

Lionesses played an important role in the religious concepts of both Upper and Lower Egypt, and are likely to have been designated as animals associated with protection and royalty. The long necks could be a simple exaggeration, used as a framing feature in an artistic motif, either forming the cosmetic-mixing area, as in the Narmer Palette, or surrounding it, as in the Small Palette.

Depictions of similar fantastic animals also are known from Elam and Mesopotamia, as well as many other cultures.

Due to birth tusks being associated with the protection of mother and child during birth or birth ceremonies, serpopards are thought to play a role in this protection.

Additionally, it has been suggested that serpopards form a barrier of protection between the netherworld and the human world. On some palettes, such as the Narmer Palette, their necks border the circle in which makeup would have been mixed. Since this makeup would have been applied to statues of deities or pharaohs, the makeup may have had to be upheld to a certain standard and protected to ensure quality.

The serpopard has erroneously been claimed to depict an ancient surviving non-Avian dinosaur by young earth creationists.

== In popular culture ==
- The Serpopards appear in The Kane Chronicles book The Red Pyramid. Two Serpopards were sent by Set to attack Philip of Macedonia, Sadie Kane, Carter Kane, and Khufu. They were defeated by Bast.
- A serpopard has appeared in the card game Magic: The Gathering in the Egyptian-themed world of Amonkhet. Its creature type is "cat snake" and it has outright serpentine traits not seen in ancient depictions.
- A serpopard attacks Malik and Karina in the necropolis beneath Ksar Alahari in A Song of Wraiths and Ruin by Roseanne A. Brown.

== See also ==
- Questing Beast – Mythical creature from Arthurian legend
- Qilin – Legendary creature in Chinese mythology
