= Frederick W. Green (Egyptologist) =

English Egyptologist

Frederick William Green (March 21, 1869 – 1949) was an English Egyptologist, who worked at a number of sites throughout Egypt. He was honorary keeper of the antiquities at the Fitzwilliam Museum in Cambridge from 1908 to 1949. Green was also a watercolour painter. He was one of the leads for the archeological digs at Heirkonpolis and worked with Quibell, publishing with Quibell their discovery of the Main Deposit.

== Biography ==
Green was born in London on 21 March 1869. His interest in Egyptology began as a child, after he was gifted some items collected by his aunt, who had lived in Alexandria. One of those items was the granite head of Senwosret III, which Green presented to the Fitzwilliam Museum in 1930.

He worked at Hierakonpolis (ancient Nekhen), where amongst other discoveries his team found the Narmer Palette in 1898.

Green studied at Jesus College in Cambridge, continuing to study Archaeology and Egyptology under Kurt Sethe for a further three years in Göttingen and Strasbourg and then excavated sites in and around Egypt with Flinders Petrie and Somers Clarke. He worked with James Quibell at Hierakonpolis from 1897 to 1898 (and alone in 1899).

Green later excavated at Eileithyiaspolis with Clarke and Archibald Sayce from 1901 to 1902. He surveyed the topography and monuments of Nubia in 1906 and 1909 to 1910. Nearing the end of his career Green led the Mond excavation of the Bucheum at Armant from 1929 to 1930. Green was the Honorary Keeper of the Antiquities at the Fitzwilliam Museum in Cambridge from 1908 to 1949.

Green was an accomplished watercolourist, he produced hundreds of paintings during his travels. In 2009 a collection of 149 paintings, together with childhood drawings and early sketchbooks have surfaced for sale on an online auction site, fully documented before their dispersal.

He died in Great Shelford, Cambridgeshire in 1949.
