= Narmer Palette =

Egyptian archaeological artifact

Coordinates: 30.0478°N 31.2333°E

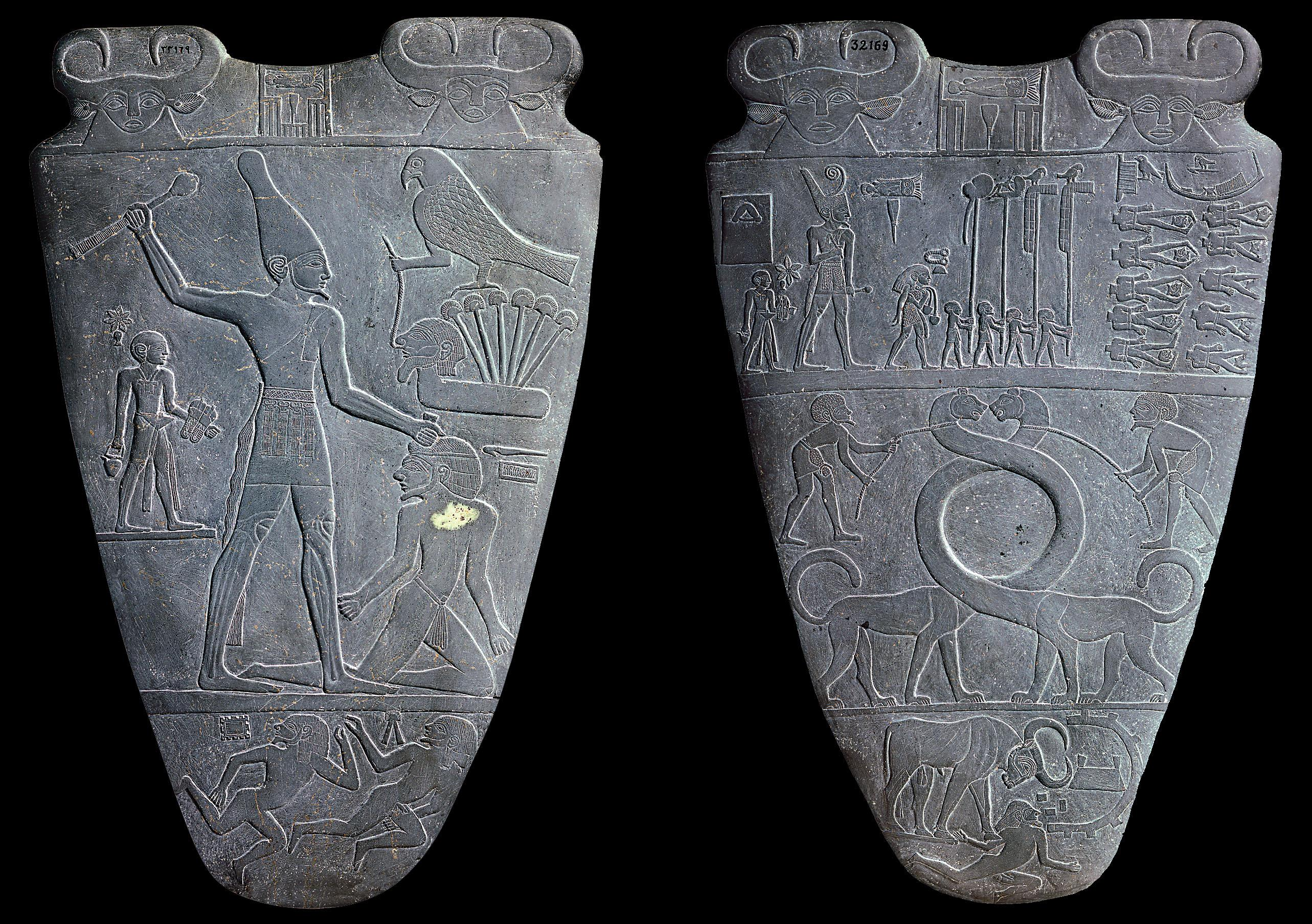
- Both sides of the Narmer Palette
- Material: Siltstone
- Size: c. 64 cm × 42 cm
- Created: 3200–3000 BC (circa)
- Discovered: 1897–1898; Hierakonpolis
- Discovered by: James Quibell; Frederick W. Green
- Present location: Egyptian Museum, Cairo

The Narmer Palette, also known as the Great Hierakonpolis Palette or the Palette of Narmer, is a significant Egyptian archaeological find, dating from about the 31st century BC, belonging, at least nominally, to the category of cosmetic palettes. It contains some of the earliest hieroglyphic inscriptions ever found. The tablet is thought by some to depict the unification of Upper and Lower Egypt under the king Narmer. Along with the Scorpion Macehead and the Narmer Maceheads, also found together in the main deposit at Nekhen, the Narmer Palette provides one of the earliest known depictions of an Egyptian king. On one side, the king is depicted with the bulbed White Crown of Upper (southern) Egypt, and the other side depicts the king wearing the level Red Crown of Lower (northern) Egypt, which also makes it the earliest known example of a king wearing both types of headdress. The Palette shows many of the classic conventions of Ancient Egyptian art, which must already have been formalized by the time of the Palette's creation. Egyptologists Bob Brier and A. Hoyt Hobbs have referred to the Narmer Palette as "The oldest Egyptian historical record".

The Palette, which has survived five millennia in almost perfect condition, was discovered by British archeologists James Quibell and Frederick W. Green, in what they called the Main Deposit in the Temple of Horus at Nekhen, during the dig season of 1897–98. Also found at this dig were the Narmer Macehead and the Scorpion Macehead. The exact place and circumstances of these finds were not recorded very clearly by Quibell and Green. In fact, Green's report placed the Palette in a different layer one or two metres (yards) away from the deposit, which is considered to be more accurate on the basis of the original excavation notes. It has been suggested that these objects were royal donations made to the temple. Nekhen, or Hierakonpolis, was one of four power centers in Upper Egypt that preceded the consolidation of Upper Egypt at the end of the Naqada III period. Hierakonpolis's religious importance continued long after its political role had declined. Palettes were typically used for grinding cosmetics, but this palette is too large and heavy (and elaborate) to have been created for personal use and was probably a ritual or votive object, specifically made for donation to, or use in, a temple. One theory is that it was used to grind cosmetics to adorn the statues of the deities.

The Narmer Palette is part of the permanent collection of the Egyptian Museum in Cairo. It is one of the initial exhibits which visitors have been able to see when entering the museum. Its inventory number is JE 32169 and its former identification number is CG 14716.

== Description ==
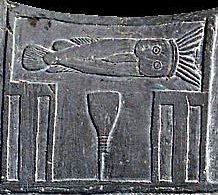
Serekhs bearing the rebus symbols nꜥr (catfish) and mr (chisel) inside, being the phonetic representation of Narmer's name

The Narmer Palette is a 63-centimetre-tall (25 in) by 42-centimetre-wide (17 in), shield-shaped, ceremonial palette, carved from a single piece of flat, soft dark gray-green greywacke. The stone has often been wrongly identified, in the past, as being slate or schist. Slate is layered and prone to flaking, and schist is a metamorphic rock containing large, randomly distributed mineral grains. Both are unlike the finely grained, hard, flake-resistant siltstone, whose source is from a well-attested quarry that has been used since pre-dynastic times at Wadi Hammamat. This material was used extensively during the pre-dynastic period for creating such palettes and also was used as a source for Old Kingdom statuary. A statue of the 2nd dynasty pharaoh Khasekhemwy, found in the same complex as the Narmer Palette at Hierakonpolis, was also made of this material.

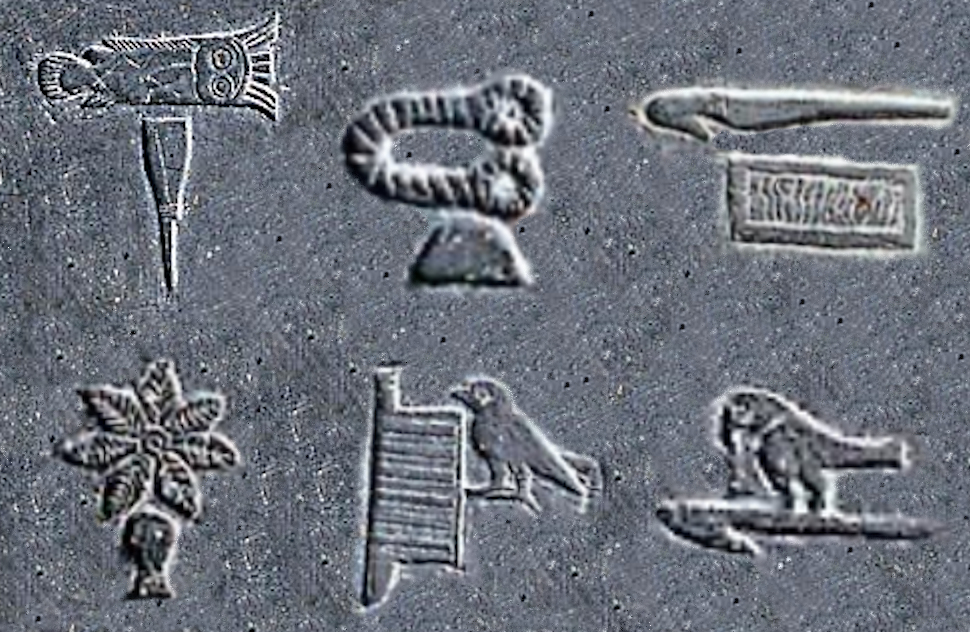
Early hieroglyphic symbols on the Narmer Palette

The Palette is carved in low relief. At the top of both sides is an identical royal insignia called a serekh, which is "a composite hieroglyphic symbol standing for the king/crown/state and the state's property". The serekhs bear the rebus symbols nꜥr (catfish) and mr (chisel) inside, being the phonetic representation of Narmer's name. Both serekhs are flanked by a pair of bovine heads with highly curved horns, thought to represent the cow goddess Bat. She was the patron deity of the seventh nome of Upper Egypt, and was also the deification of the cosmos within Egyptian mythology during the pre-dynastic and Old Kingdom periods of Ancient Egyptian history.

=== Recto side ===
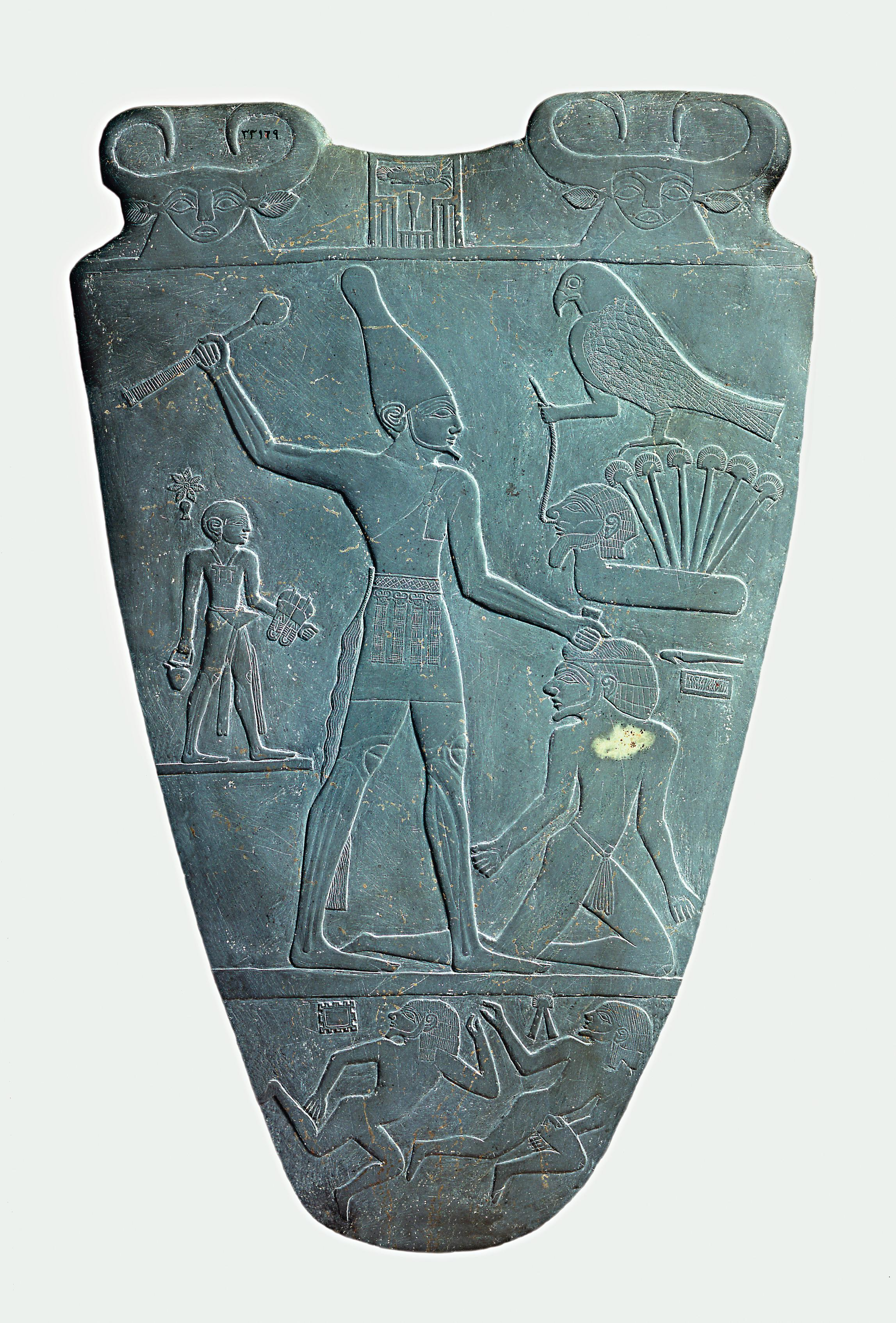
Narmer Palette (recto)

Depicted at the top of either side, two human-faced bovine heads, thought to represent the patron cow goddess Bat, flank the serekh of Narmer. The goddess Bat is, as she often was, shown in portrait, rather than in profile as is traditional in Egyptian relief carving. Hathor, who shared many of Bat's characteristics, is often depicted in a similar manner.

The largest relief on this side depicts Narmer, who lifts a royal mace in his right hand while with his left he pulls up a kneeling captive by the hair. In contrast to the verso depiction of Narmer, where he is shown with the Red Crown of Lower Egypt, on this side he wears the White Crown of Upper Egypt. His pose reflects the Ancient Egyptian convention of showing an important figure from multiple perspectives at once. His feet, legs and head are shown in profile, while the torso and hips turn slightly and his shoulders face the front. One eye, even though it would normally not be seen if this were an actual profile head, is also shown from the front. The purpose was to provide the most complete information possible about a person on a flat surface. The Palette also shows the Egyptian canon of body proportions. Based on an established unit correlating to the distance across the knuckles of human fist, this conventional form of measurement was a means of standardizing the proportions of important figures in Egyptian art. The standard measurement of 18 fists from the ground to the hairline on the forehead is apparent in the Palette. Both artistic conventions remained in use until at least the conquest by Alexander the Great. The minor figures in active poses, such as the king's captive, the corpses and the handlers of the serpopard beasts, are much more freely depicted.

Detail of the Narmer Palette showing a belt with four beaded tassels topped with depictions of Bat similar to those seen at the top of the palette as well as a fringe at the back representing the tail of a bull

Attached to the belt worn by Narmer are four beaded tassels, each capped with an ornament in the shape of the head of the goddess Hathor. They also are the same heads as those that adorn the top of each side of the palette. At the back of the belt is attached a long fringe representing a bull's tail.

On the left of the king is a man bearing the king's sandals, flanked by a rosette symbol. To the right of the king is a kneeling prisoner, who is about to be struck by the king. A pair of symbols appear next to his head perhaps indicating his name (Wash) or indicating the region where he was from. Above the prisoner is a falcon, representing Horus, perched above a set of papyrus flowers, the symbol of Upper Egypt. In his talons, he holds a rope-like object which appears to be attached to the nose of a man's head that also emerges from the papyrus flowers.

=== Verso side ===
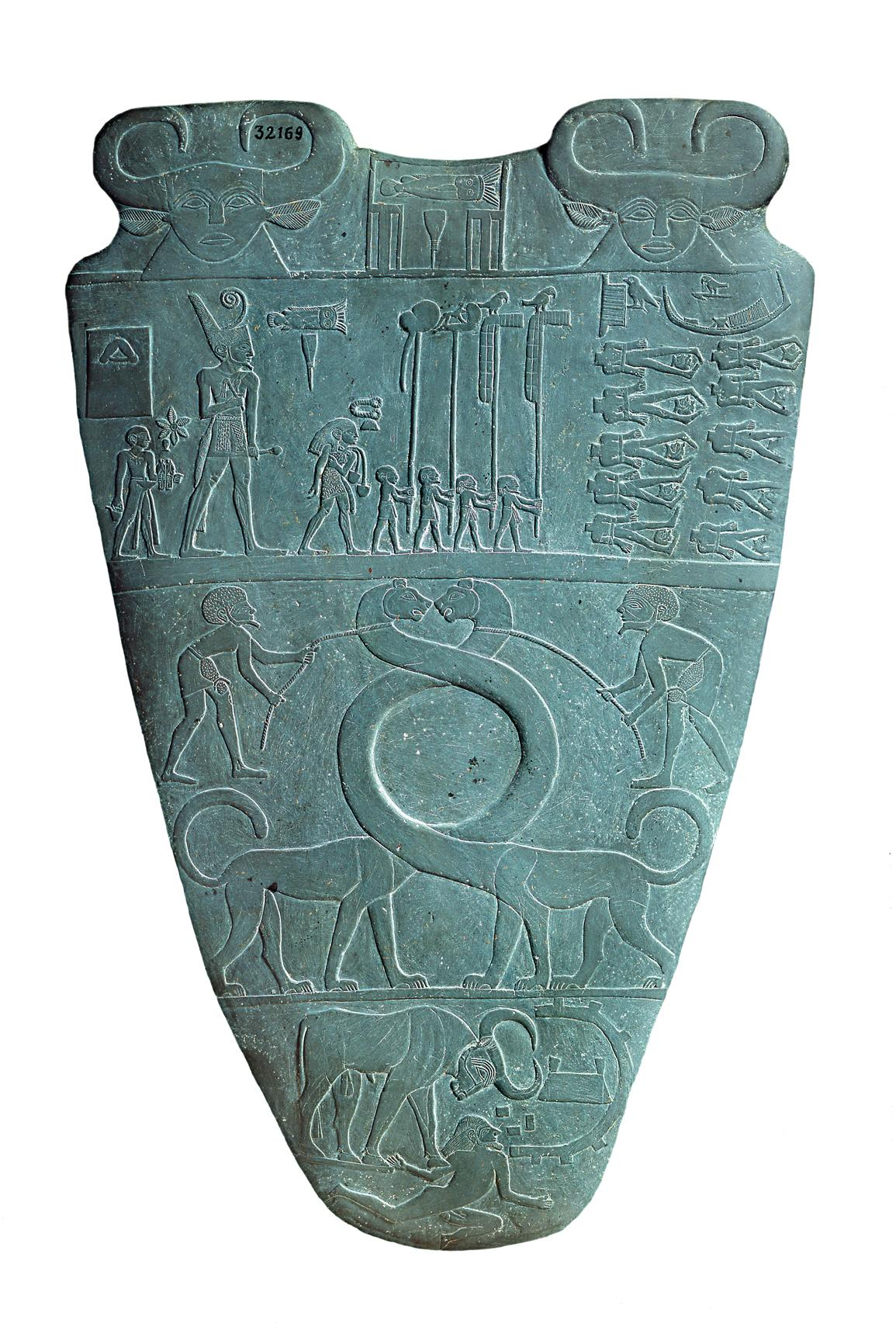
Narmer Palette (verso)

Below the bovine heads is what appears to be a procession. Narmer is significantly larger than anyone else on that register, an artistic convention known variously as hierarchical proportion, hierarchic scale or hierarchy of scale. As on the recto, his disproportionate size reinforces the ideas of conquest and political power as a god-like leader. He wears a Red Crown of Lower Egypt, symbolized by a papyrus. He holds a mace and a flail, two traditional symbols of kingship. To his right are the hieroglyphic symbols for his name, though not contained within a serekh. Behind him is his sandal-bearer, whose name may be represented by the rosette appearing adjacent to his head, and a second rectangular symbol that has no clear interpretation, but which has been suggested may represent a town or citadel.

Immediately in front of the pharaoh is a long-haired man, accompanied by a pair of hieroglyphs that have been interpreted as his name: Tshet (this assumes that these symbols had the same phonetic value used in later hieroglyphic writing). Before this man are four standard bearers, holding aloft an animal skin, a dog, and two falcons. At the far right of this scene are ten decapitated corpses with their heads placed between their legs and their severed genitals placed atop each head. These figures are generally understood to be victims of Narmer's conquest. Above them are symbols for a ship, a falcon holding a harpoon and a door.

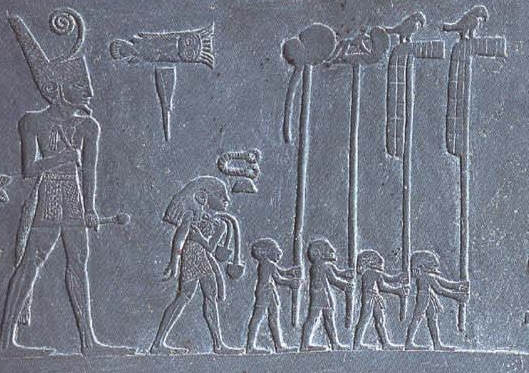
A detail from the Narmer Palette, with the oldest known depiction of vexilloids

Below the procession, two men are holding ropes tied to the outstretched, intertwining necks of two serpopards confronting each other. The serpopard is a mythological creature, a mix of serpent and leopard. The circle formed by their curving necks is the central part of the Palette, which is the area where the cosmetics would have been ground. Upper and Lower Egypt each worshipped lioness war goddesses as protectors; the intertwined necks of the serpopards may thus represent the unification of the state. Similar images of such mythical animals are known from other contemporaneous cultures, and there are other examples of late-predynastic objects (including other palettes and knife handles such as the Gebel el-Arak Knife) which borrow similar elements from Mesopotamian iconography, suggesting Egypt-Mesopotamia relations.

At the bottom of the verso, a bull is seen knocking down the walls of a city while trampling on a fallen foe. Head lowered, Narmer is shown here as a stylized, two-dimensional beast who will vanquish his enemies. Bulls had an ideological connection to Egyptian kingship. "Bull of his Mother", for example, was a common epithet given to an Egyptian king as the son of the patron cow goddess. This posture of a bovine has the meaning of "force" in later hieroglyphics.

== Scholarly debate ==
The Palette has raised considerable scholarly debate over the years. In general, the arguments fall into one of two camps: scholars who believe that the Palette is a record of an important event, and other academics who argue that it is an object designed to establish the mythology of united rule over Upper and Lower Egypt by the king. It had been thought that the Palette either depicted the unification of Lower Egypt by the king of Upper Egypt, or recorded a recent military success over the Libyans, or the last stronghold of a Lower Egyptian dynasty based in Buto. More recently, scholars such as Nicholas Millet have argued that the Palette does not represent a historical event (such as the unification of Egypt), but instead represents the events of the year in which the object was dedicated to the temple. Whitney Davis has suggested that the iconography on this and other pre-dynastic palettes has more to do with establishing the king as a visual metaphor of the conquering hunter, caught in the moment of delivering a mortal blow to his enemies. John Baines has suggested that the events portrayed are "tokens of royal achievement" from the past and that "the chief purpose of the piece is not to record an event but to assert that the king dominates the ordered world in the name of the gods and has defeated internal, and especially external, forces of disorder".

== In popular culture ==
The Narmer Palette is featured in the 2009 film Watchmen as one of the Egyptian objects that are present in Ozymandias's office. The Australian author Jackie French used the Palette, and recent research into Sumerian trade routes, to create her historical novel Pharaoh (2007). The Palette is featured in manga artist Yukinobu Hoshino's short story El Alamein no Shinden. The Palette is also featured in The Kane Chronicles by Rick Riordan where the palette is fetched by a magical shawabti servant. In Ubisoft's 2017 game Assassin's Creed Origins, the Palette is mentioned as a trivia bit in loading screen tips. The Narmer Palette is a main plot point in Lincoln Child’s The Third Gate novel, in which they attempt to find the tomb of king Narmer in the Sudd.

== See also ==
- List of ancient Egyptian palettes
- Libyan Palette (another well-known Predynastic Egyptian palette)
- Warka Vase (a comparable contemporaneous work of narrative relief sculpture from the Sumerian civilisation)
- Kish tablet
