= Zoomorphic palette =

Ancient Egyptian artifacts

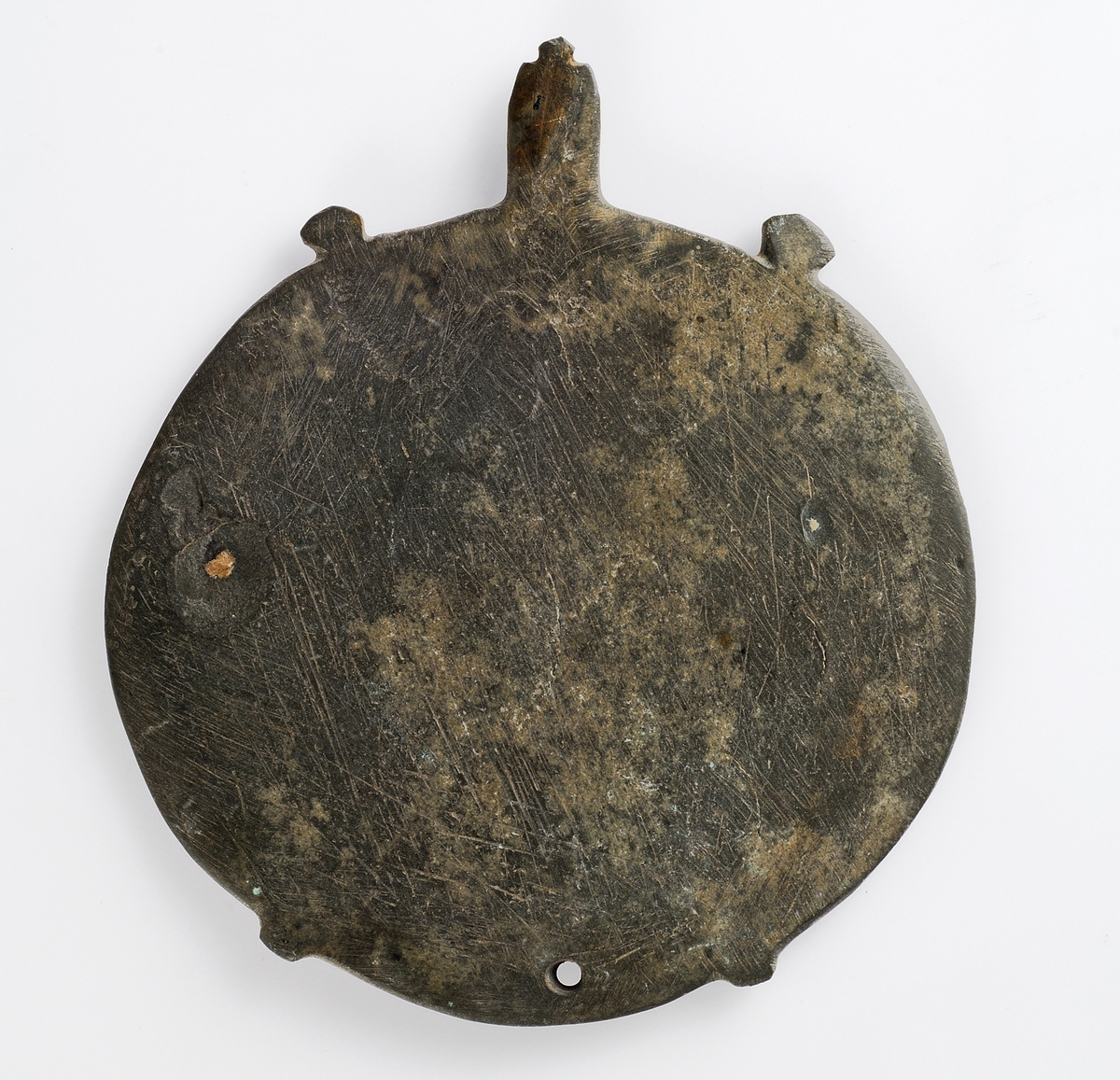
The Cosmetic palette in the form of a Nile tortoise

The zoomorphic palette is a type of cosmetic palette made during the predynastic period of Egypt. The palettes are found at burial sites, for example Abydos in the second half of the 4th millennium BC.

== Overview ==
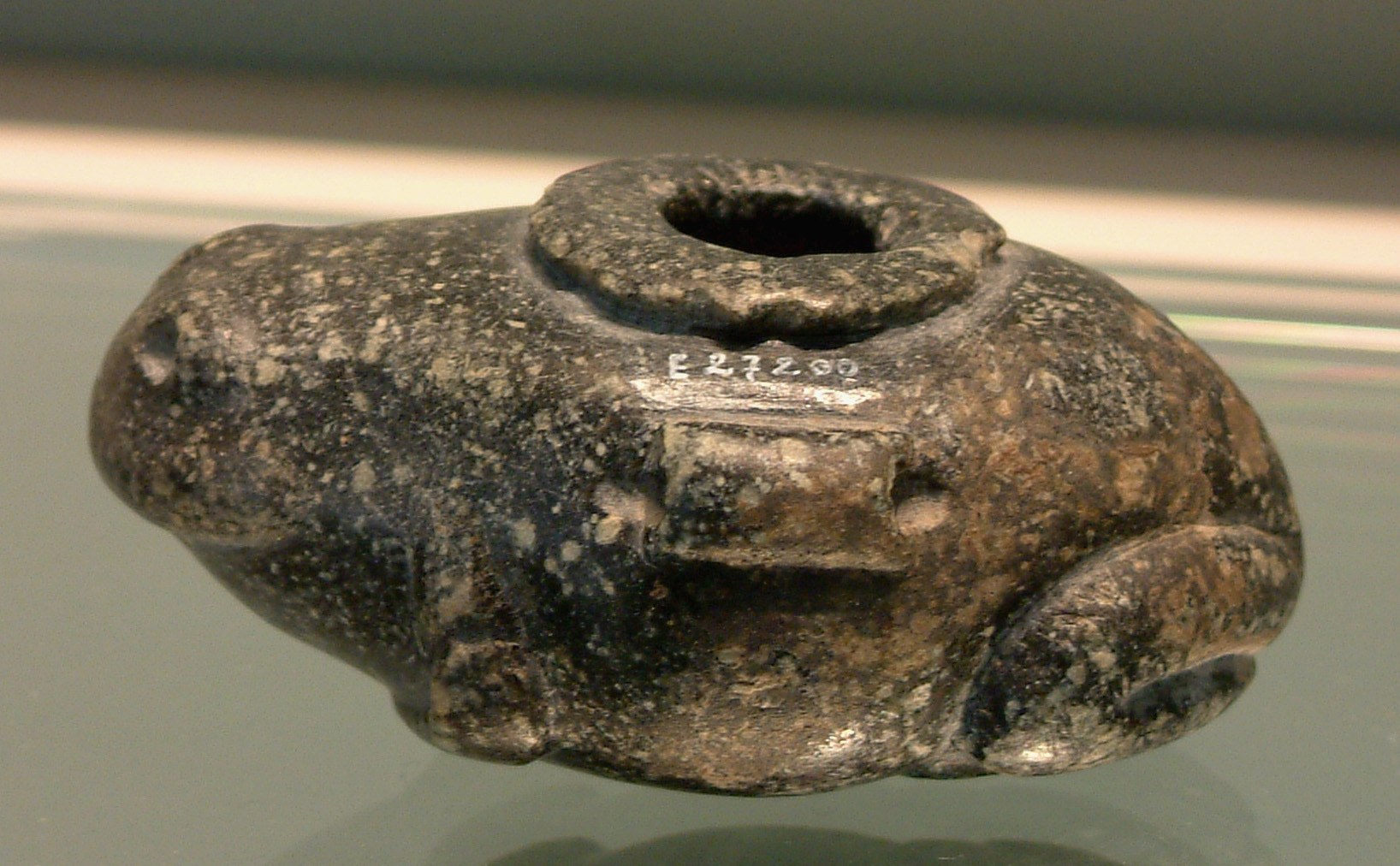
An example of a zoomorphic bowl, drilled stone.

The term zoomorphic, or animal style, refers to the palette being made in the shape of the animal portrayed. Some examples of similar shaped pieces are made in pottery, specifically drilled stone bowls in a zoomorphic shape. Animal shapes were common in the prehistory of the Iranian regions.

Examples of the animal types represented are turtles, fish, hippopotami, crocodiles, ducks, and elephants.

Many examples feature shell-inlays representing the eyes of the animal. Other details of an animal, such as the fins on a fish, were also commonly depicted with incisions. Some palettes contain suspension holes. In the Naqada II period the centre of these zoomorphic palettes is always left free of decoration to facilitate the functional use of the object. Certain examples feature worn down and damaged centres, as well as staining from the pigment, due to their long history of use, possibly over several generations. It appears that the zoomorphic palette type followed the creation of the Rhomboidal cosmetic palette type.

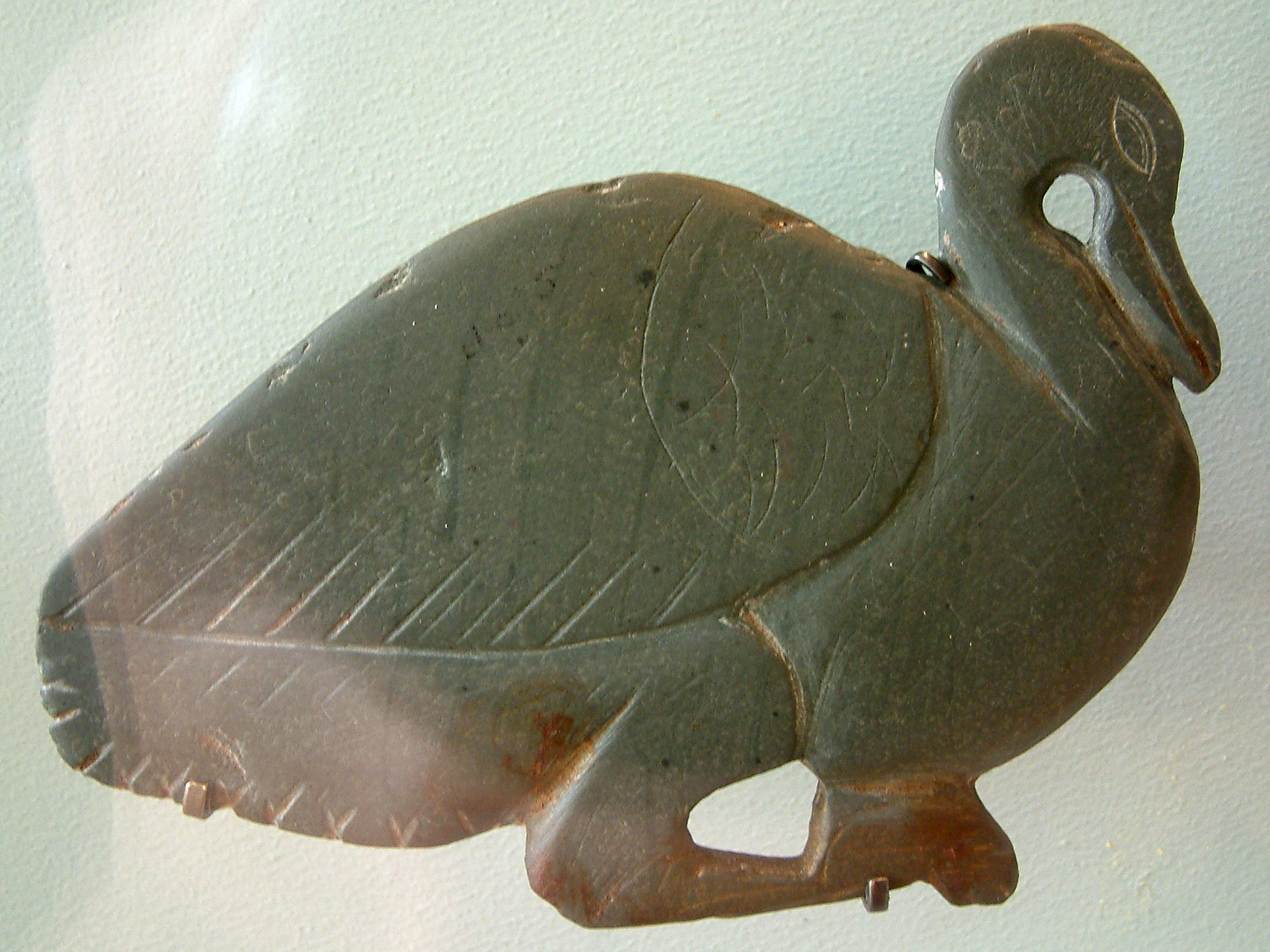
Duck-(goose)

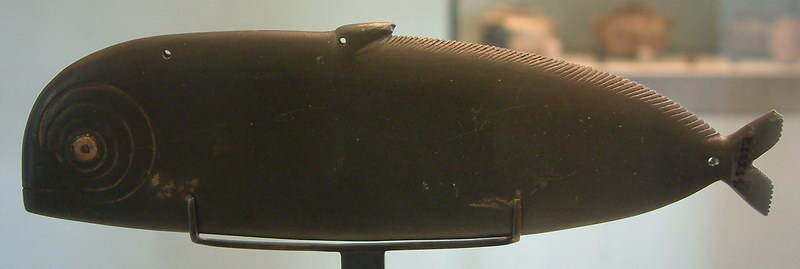
Fish-(atypical type)

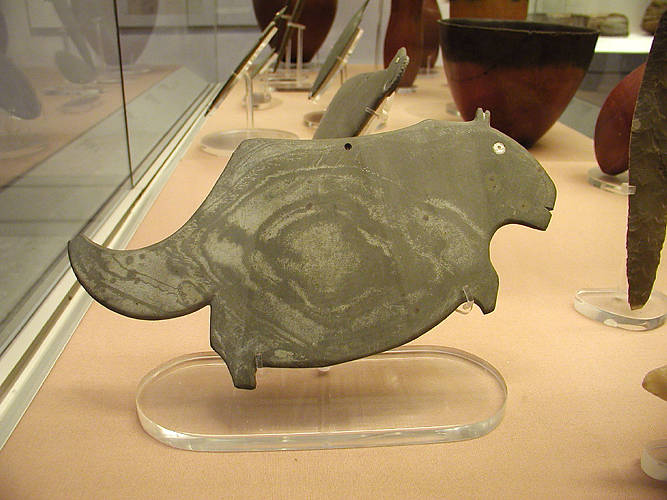
Hippo-shaped

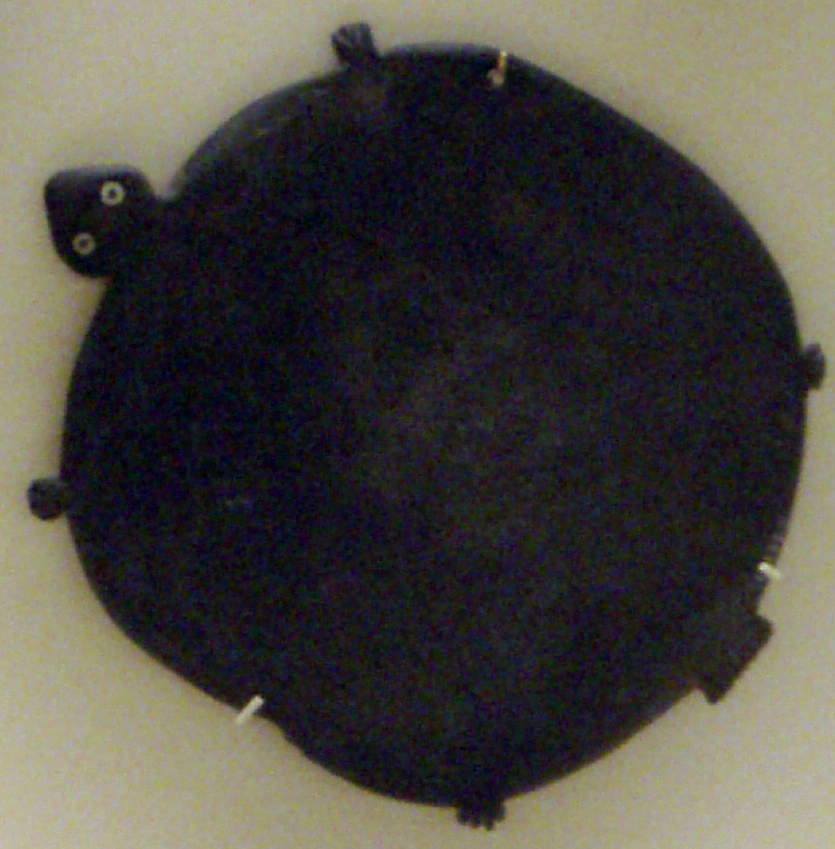
Turtle

== See also ==
- List of ancient Egyptian palettes
- Cosmetic palette
