= Cosmetic palette in the form of a Nile tortoise =

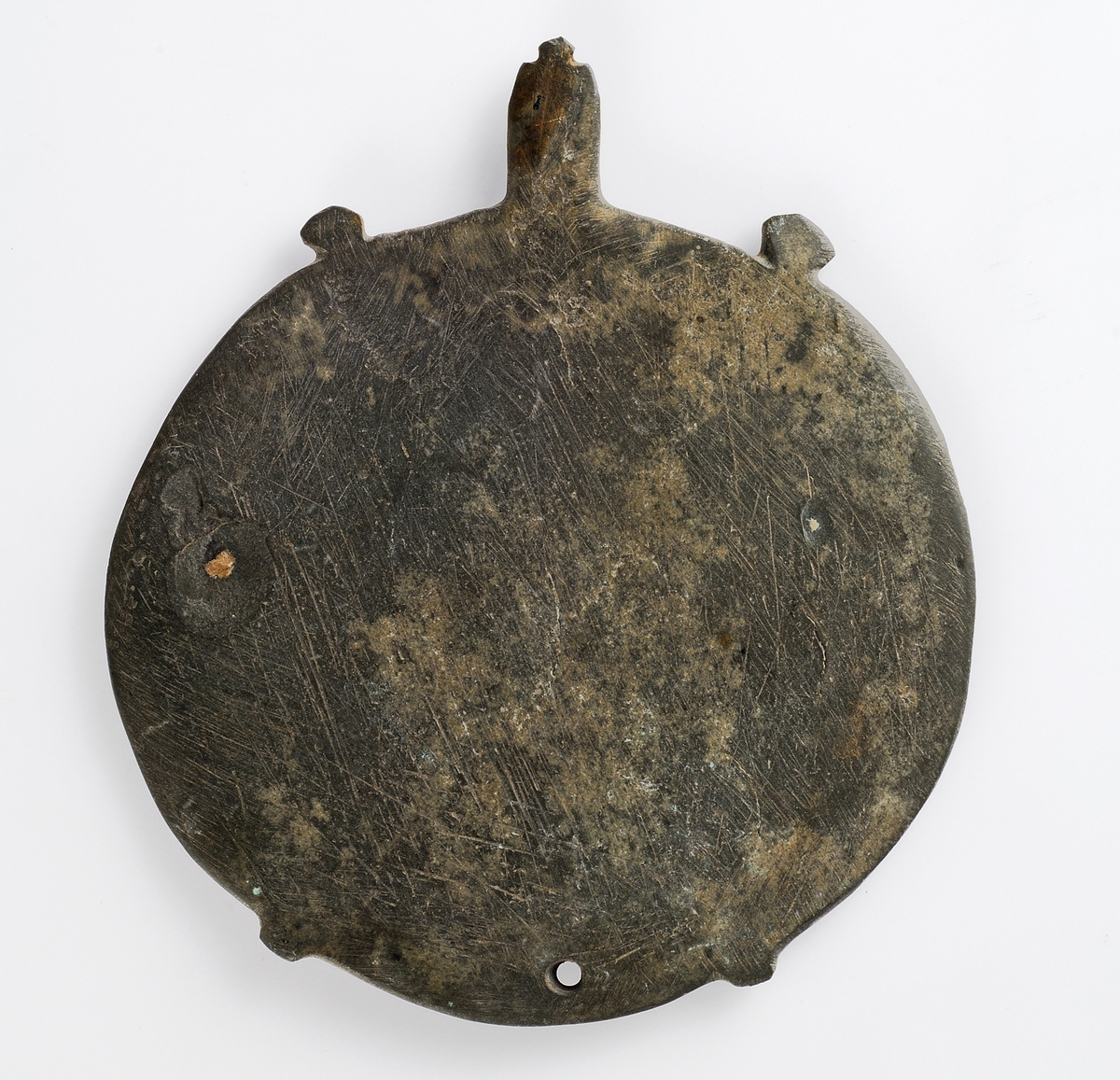

Cosmetic palette in the form of a Nile tortoise is a Naqada culture Pre-Dynastic Egyptian antiquity, made of schist, dating to the 4th millennium BC and now in the collection of the Musée des Beaux-Arts de Lyon. It is a cosmetic palette in the shape of a Trionyx soft-shell turtle from the River Nile.

== See also ==
- Zoomorphic palette
- Fish cosmetic palette

== Sources ==
- Jean-Claude Goyon, L'Égypte antique : à travers la collection de l'institut d'égyptologie Victor-Loret de Lyon, Paris - Lyon, Somogy - musée des Beaux-Arts de Lyon, 2007, 120 p. (ISBN 978-2-7572-0139-8).
