= Fish cosmetic palette =

Ancient Egyptian artifacts

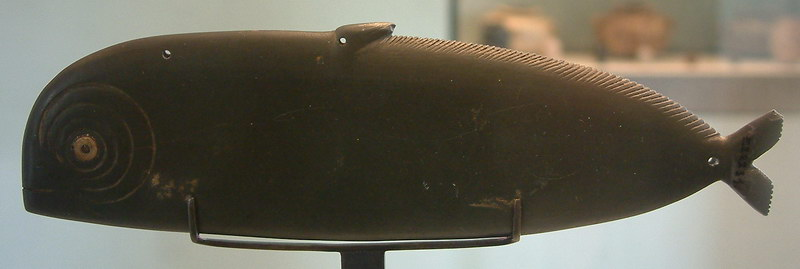
A fish palette- (dolphin type).

The fish palettes of predynastic Egypt are one of the common types of cosmetic palettes, or more specifically zoomorphic palettes, which are shaped in the form of the animal portrayed. The fish palettes are mostly ovoid in shape.

The palettes are made mostly of schist, greywacke, mudstone, etc.

== Description ==
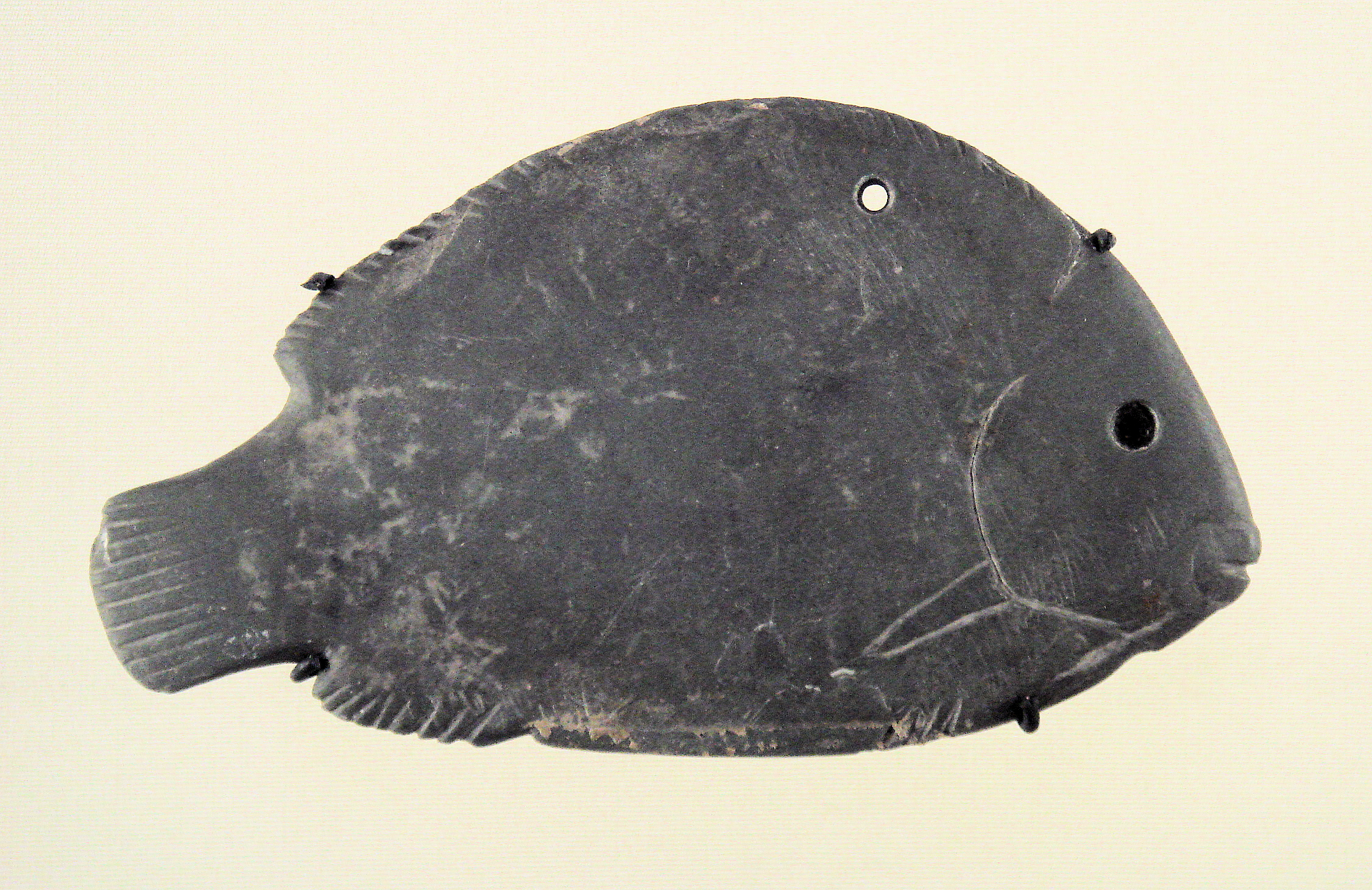
A rare Naqada III Eye-paint palette found in Ashkelon or Gaza, end of 4th millennium. A Tilapia nilotica, Louvre Museum AO 5359.

The oldest cosmetic palettes from the Badarian, or Naqada I period are less adorned than later versions; also some gradation of ornateness should be considered for graves and tombs of less high-status individuals being interred, as these were common forms of grave goods during the Naqada periods.

Most of the ovoid shaped fish were like the hieroglyphs later used, the Bulti Fish-(Gardiner's Sign List) K1, Tilapia nilotica, K1, or a very ovoid form of the hieroglyph K5, K5.

== Example fish palettes ==
=== Bulti fish, NCMA ===
The North Carolina Museum of Art has a Bulti-fish palette, greywacke, with dimensions about 5 x 3.25 in. It is smaller than the large palettes, but has fins portrayed on the dorsal, tail, and pectoral fins, front and rear. The mouth is formed, and there is a suspension hole.

=== Bulti palette, Adaima Tomb S218 ===
A 19 cm (7 in) long Bulti-fish type palette was found at Adaima, Egypt, Tomb S218. It is probably Naqada I, has a simple, truncated height dorsal fin, but is of the extended body length, as in the Bulti fish. It has a very simple stub of a tail fin, no fins incised, and 3 lines each for forward, and rear pectoral fins. Two forward arced lines form gill slits, and a yellowish eye is made with inlay.

=== Louvre dolphin type ===
The Louvre dolphin type fish palette is a Naqada I, or II palette. It has simple fish fin grooves on its tail, and its dorsal fin, towards the rear. The palette has an inlaid white eye, (often of shell). Because of its extended length, it contains three suspension holes.

=== Vienna fish palette ===
The fish palette at the Kunsthistorisches Museum, Vienna, is more ornate than common fish palettes. It is a Bulti-fish type, and notable for a large cosmetic mixing circle adorning the center of the fish (photo: ). Other small animals are inscribed on the fish body in low bas relief, a fish, a duck with two ducklings, a crocodile, and a 2nd bird.

== See also ==
- List of ancient Egyptian palettes
- Cosmetic palette in the form of a Nile tortoise
