= Cosmetic palette =

Archaeological palettes used for grinding pigments and cosmetics

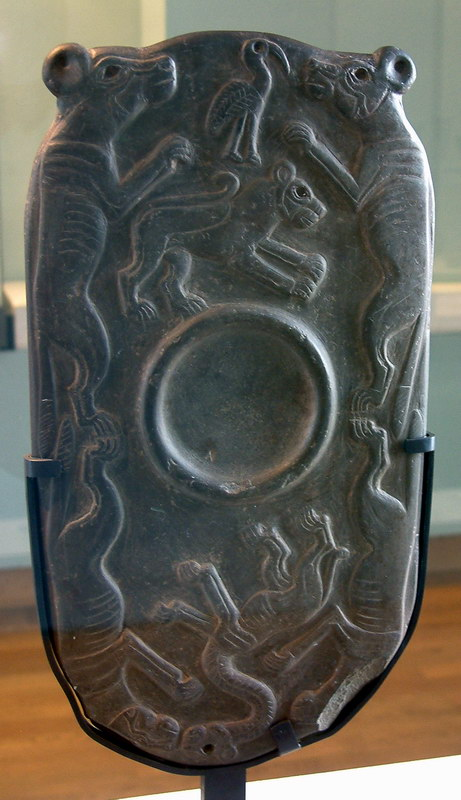
The Four Dogs Palette in greywacke, 32 × 17.7 × 1.8 cm, Naqada IIIA–B, c. 3200–3100 BCE; Louvre Museum, E 11052, Room 633.

A cosmetic palette is a surface, generally of stone, used to grind pigments for the preparation of cosmetics. Palettes are particularly characteristic of Predynastic Egypt, where they were made chiefly from grey-green stone quarried in the Wadi Hammamat and took both geometric and zoomorphic forms. During Naqada III, large relief-carved examples conventionally described as ceremonial palettes appeared and are associated in archaeological literature with the development of royal ideology; examples include the Narmer Palette, the Two Dogs Palette, the Hunters Palette and the Battlefield Palette. The use of both ordinary and ceremonial Predynastic palettes declined at the beginning of the First Dynasty, and the characteristic flat, shaped grey-stone palettes had disappeared as a category by the middle of the dynasty.

The term is also used for artefacts from other regions: in the southern Levant it is applied to small concave vessels of the Iron Age, although their use for cosmetics has not been directly demonstrated, while in Gandhara it denotes small concave stone dishes found mainly in north-western Pakistan.

== Function, materials and contexts of use ==
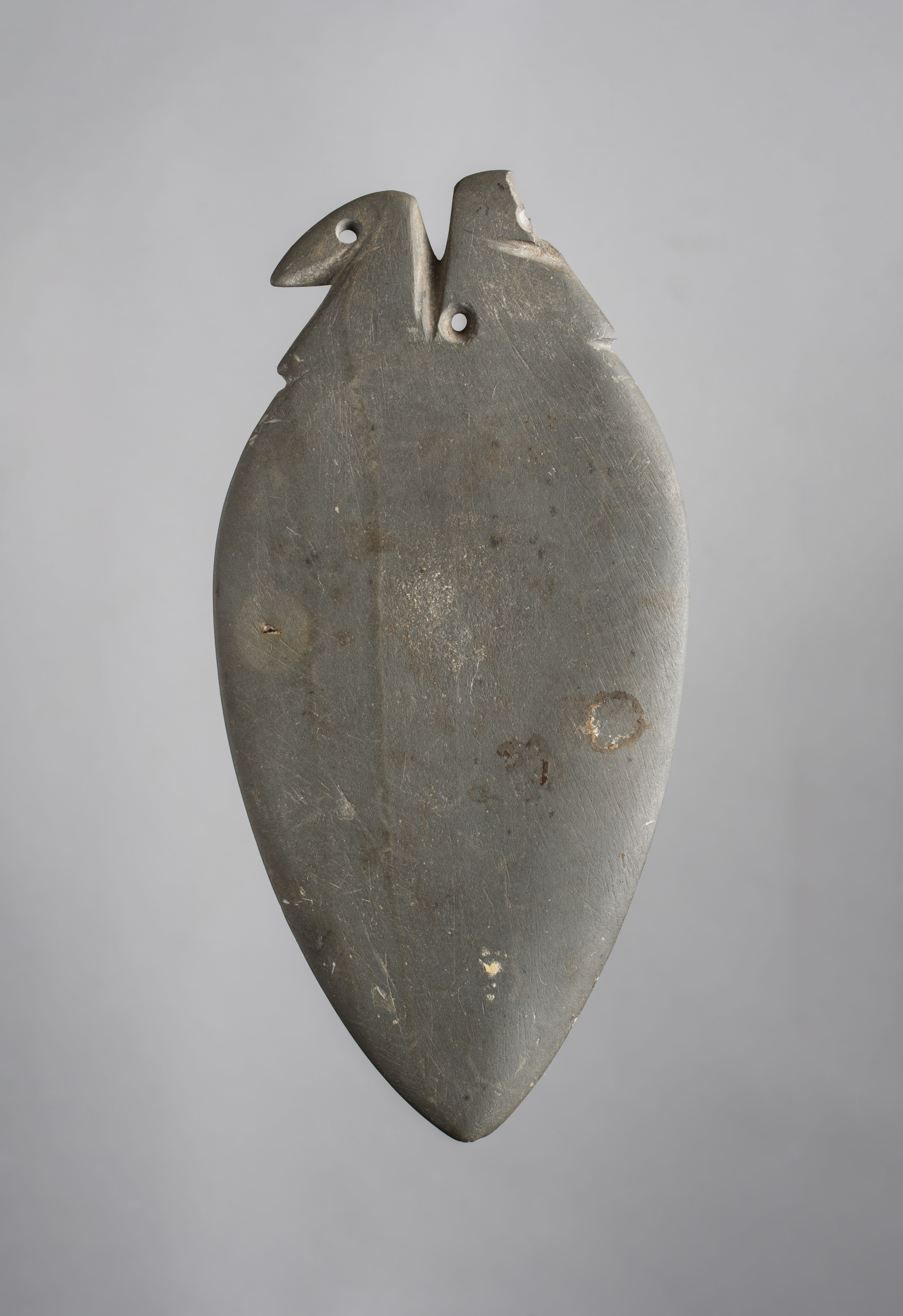
Greywacke cosmetic palette, Naqada IB–IIB, 3700–3550 BCE; Museo Egizio, Turin (Suppl. 606).

Malachite is the substance most frequently found on palettes from Predynastic burials; galena, hematite and red ochre are also attested, while malachite preserved on the faces of some bodies at Adaima shows that green pigment was applied to the body. Pigments could be mixed with resins, oils or fats and were ground with small smooth pebbles, often of brown or black jasper, which have been found in graves together with palettes. Repeated use produced deep depressions in some palettes and smoothed broken edges in others, indicating that certain pieces continued to be used after they had fractured.

A study of the Predynastic palettes in the collection of the Musée des Confluences in Lyon examined manufacturing marks, traces produced by pigment grinding and the presence or absence of deposits of matter on the objects. In burials, palettes occur with both children and adults, usually near the hands or face of the deceased; in the Predynastic cemeteries examined by Stevenson they occur on average in about 15 per cent of graves and are more frequent in female burials, although they are not restricted to them. Most examples do not come from the graves with the richest assemblages.

From the Badarian period onward, palettes in Upper Egypt were made almost exclusively from grey-green stone obtained from the Wadi Hammamat. The traditional descriptions "slate" and "schist" are geologically inaccurate for this material; Stevenson uses greywacke as a general designation encompassing finer-grained siltstone and mudstone varieties. Exceptions in other materials are also known, including limestone and quartz. These palettes would not always be used for comsmetic purposes but also simply as decor, which is part of the reason they are found in tombs.

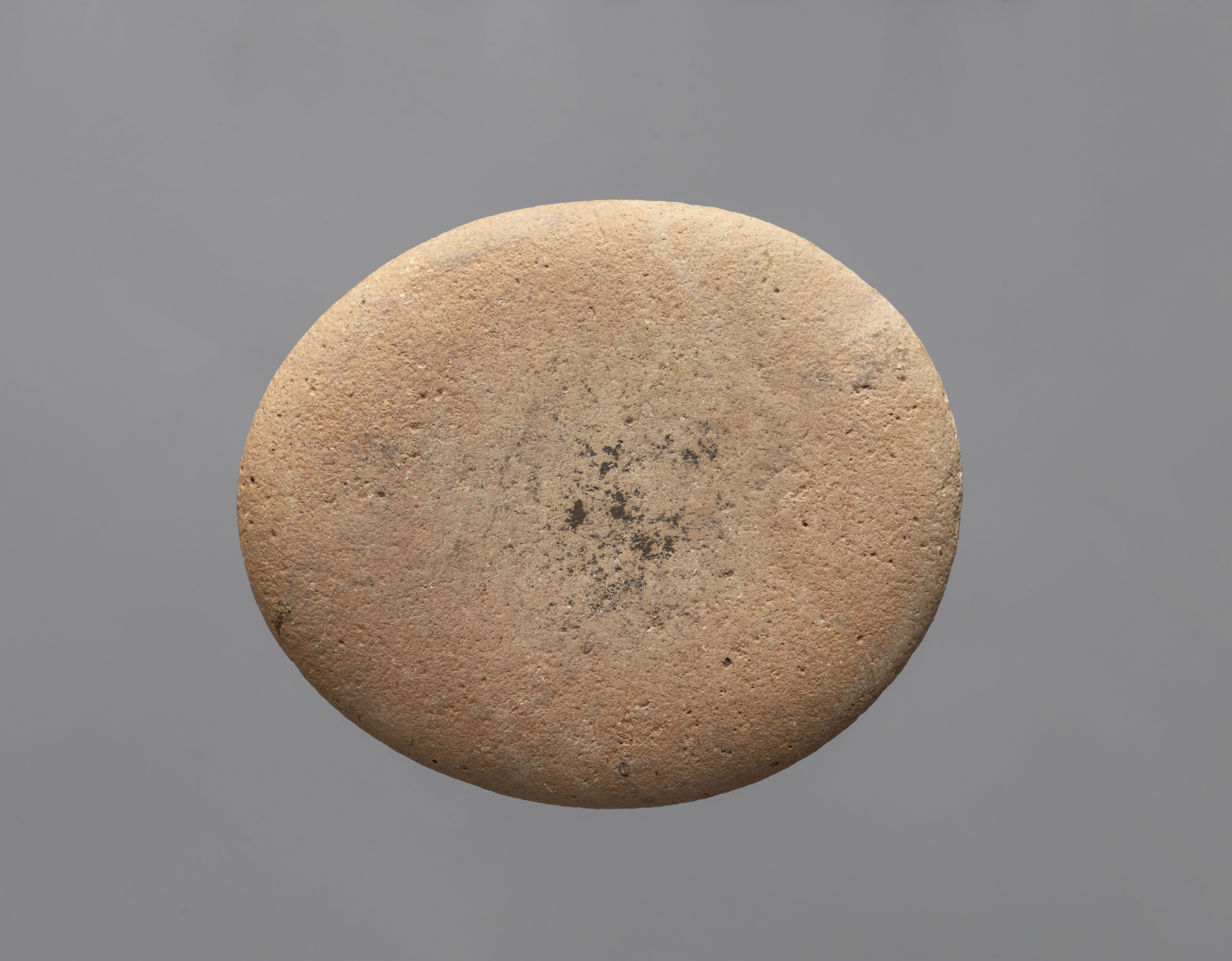
Limestone cosmetic palette, 8.7 × 7.4 × 0.9 cm, Naqada IIC–IIIA, 3500–3200 BCE; excavated at Heliopolis and held by the Museo Egizio, Turin, Suppl. 4034/01.

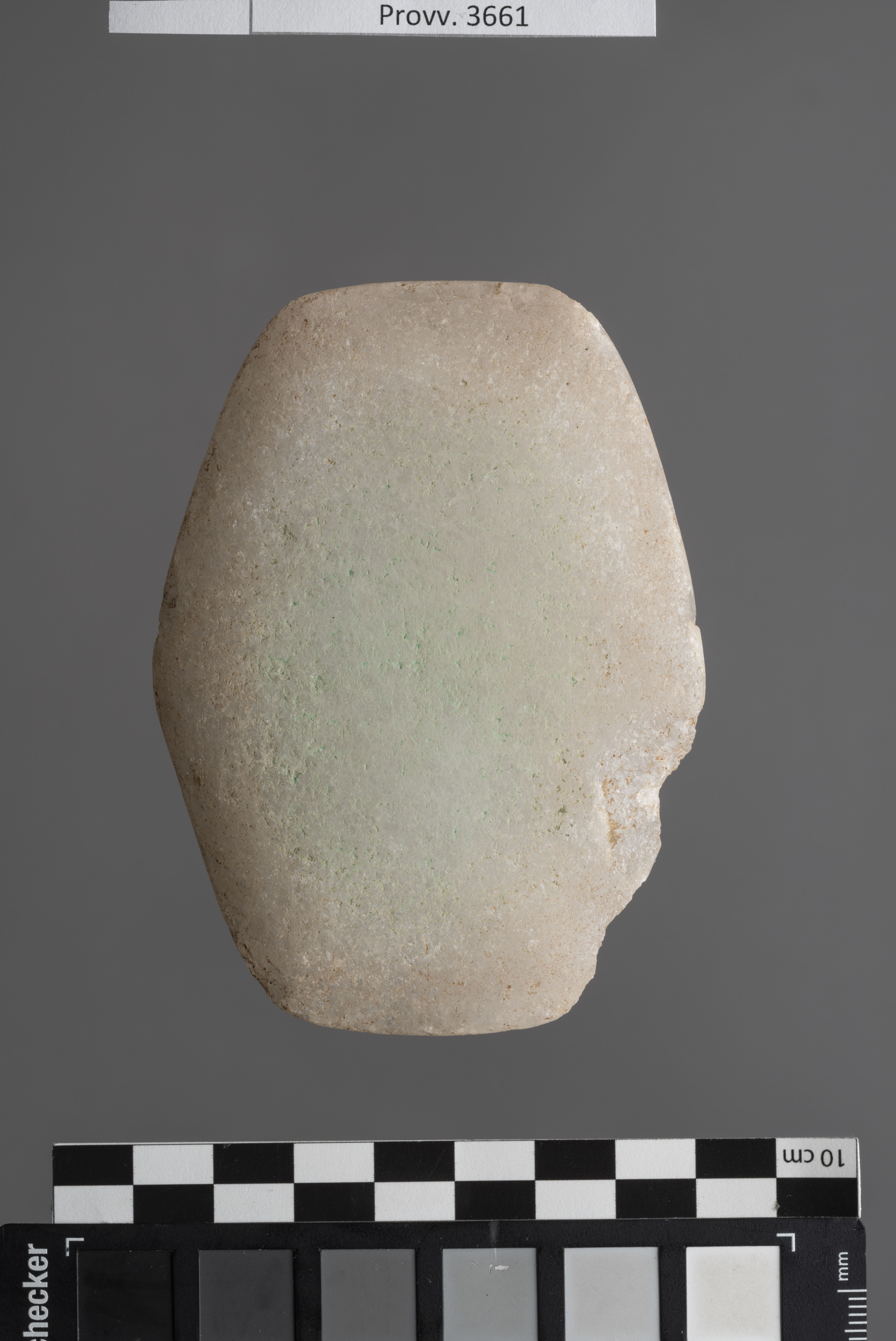
Rectangular quartz cosmetic palette, 9.5 × 7 × 1 cm, 3600–3000 BCE, from Tomb 1 at Tamit; Museo Egizio, Turin, Provv. 3661.

== In ancient Egypt ==
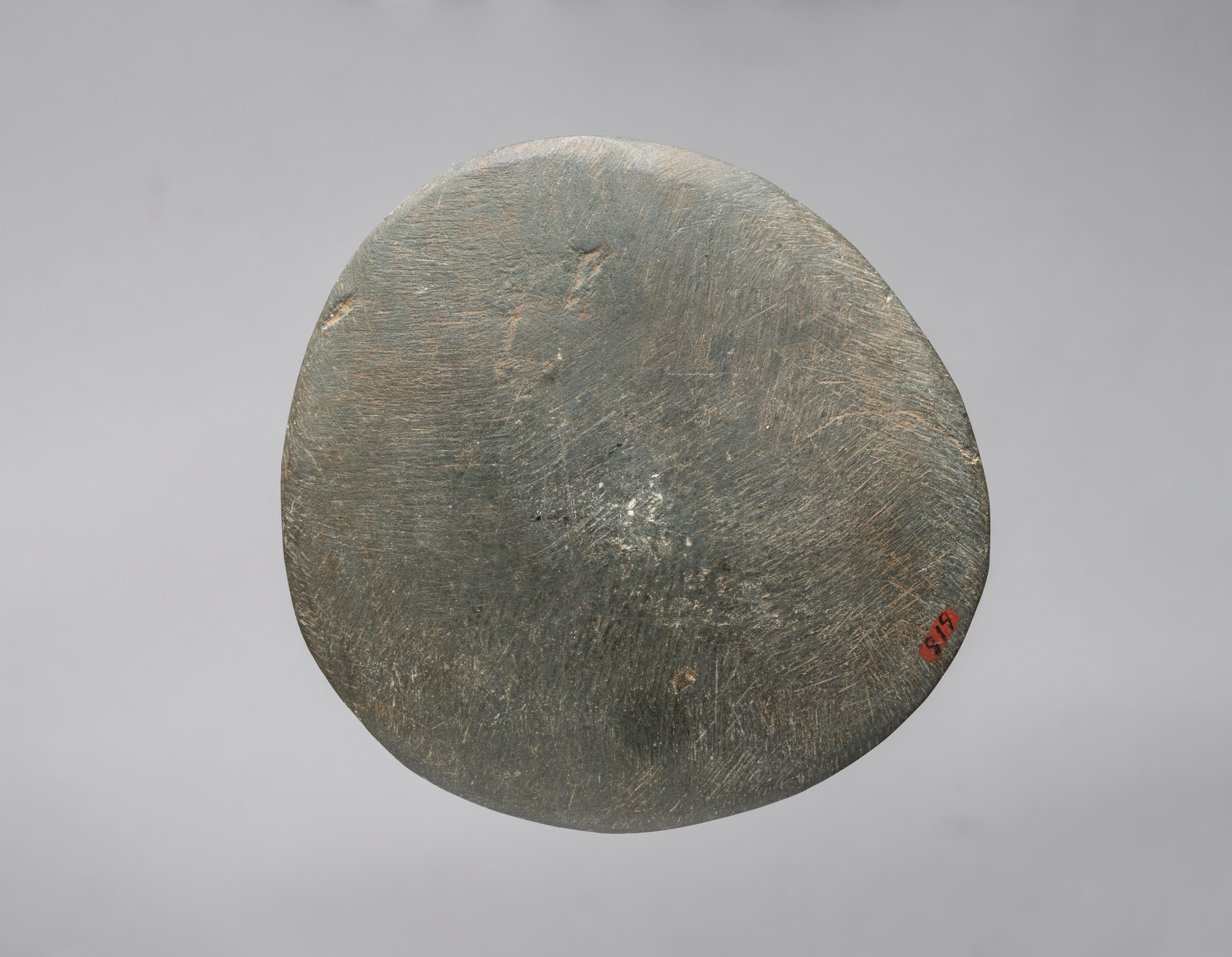
Greywacke cosmetic palette, Naqada IIIB, Protodynastic Period, 3200–3060 BCE; Museo Egizio, Turin (Suppl. 618).

=== Origins and Naqada I ===
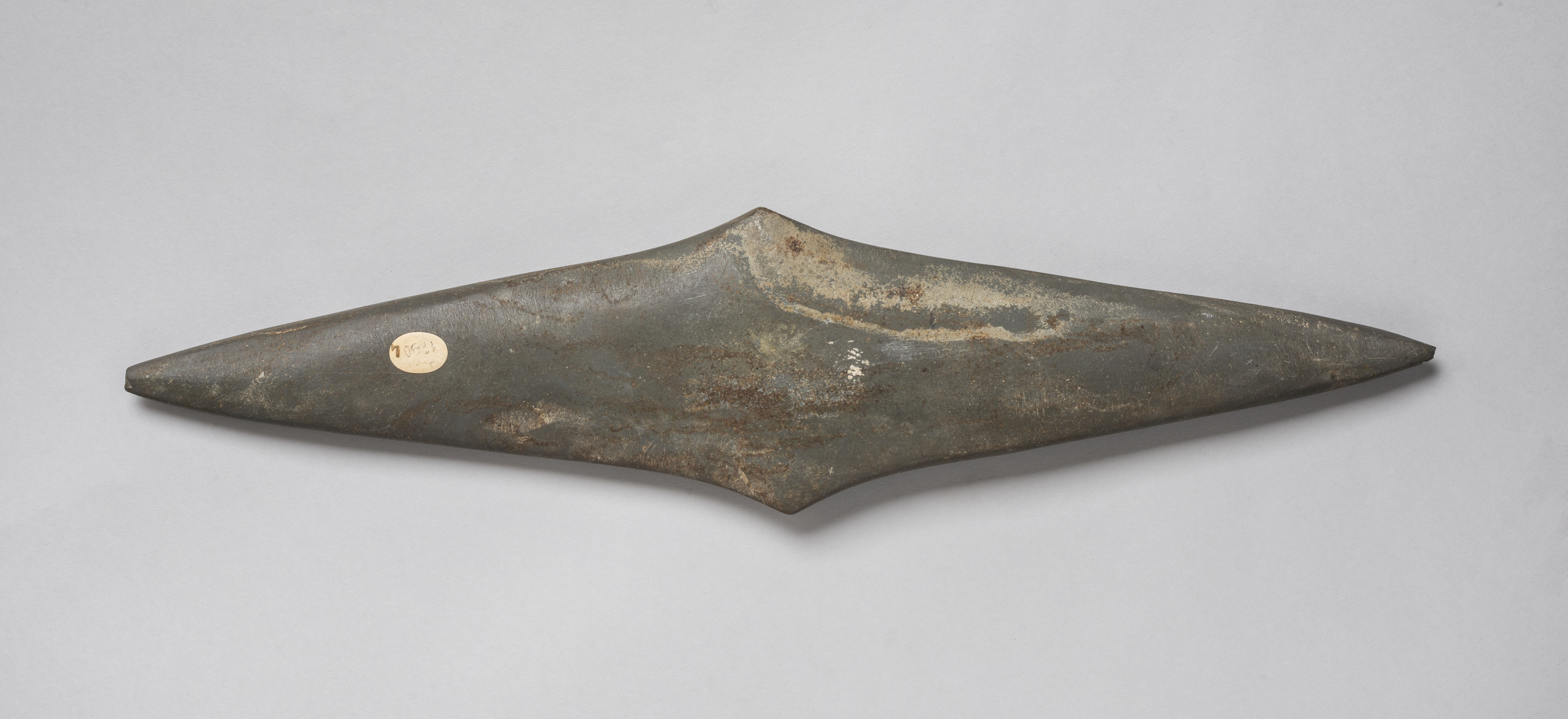
Rhomboid greywacke cosmetic palette from Gebelein, 47.8 × 11.2 × 2 cm, Naqada I, 3900–3700 BCE; Museo Egizio, Turin (Suppl. 17504).

Stone surfaces used for grinding coloured substances are known from Palaeolithic and Neolithic sites in Egypt; in the Badarian period, purpose-shaped palettes appear, often elongated and notched at the ends. In Naqada I, rhomboid forms predominate, ranging in length from about 2 cm to more than 70 cm; some examples terminate in horns or a bird-like head. Their long use-life makes palettes less reliable chronological indicators than pottery.

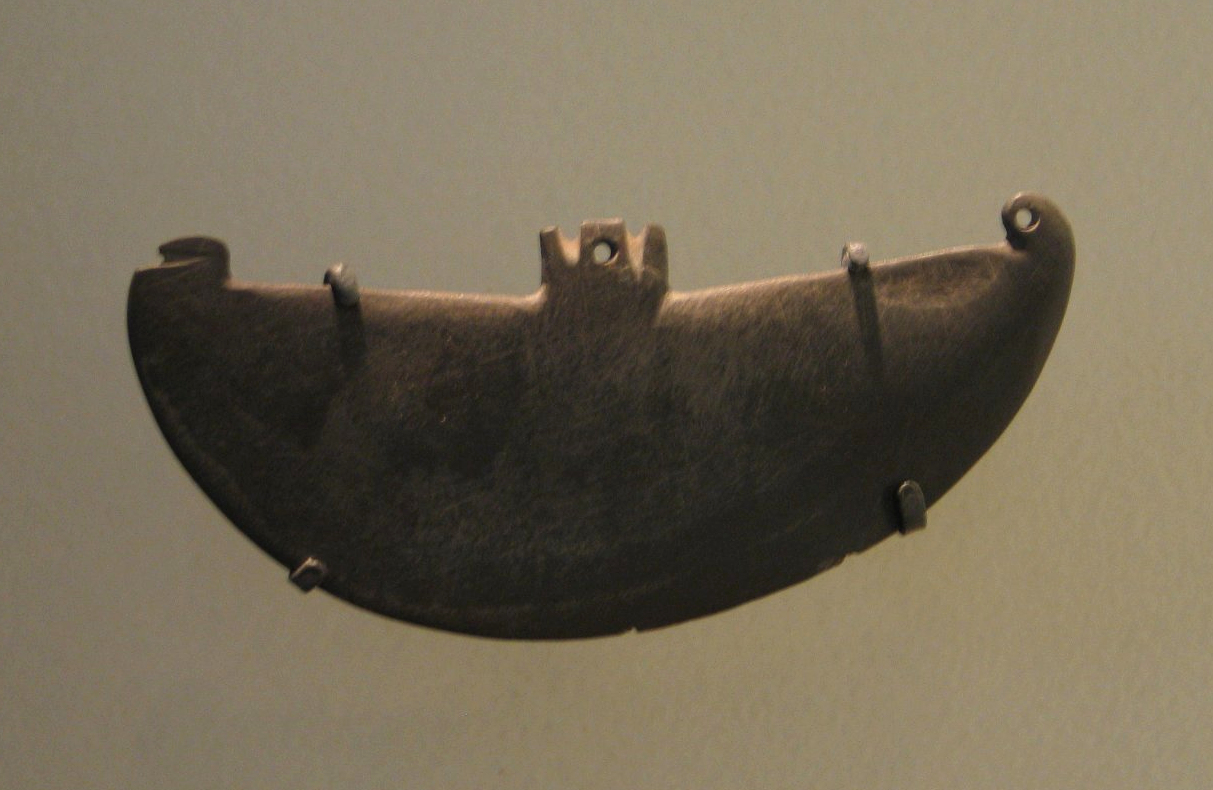
Greywacke boat-shaped palette, 10.7 × 4.6 cm, late Naqada I, c. 3700–3600 BCE, from El Ma'mariya; Brooklyn Museum, 07.447.613. The museum catalogue records traces of use.

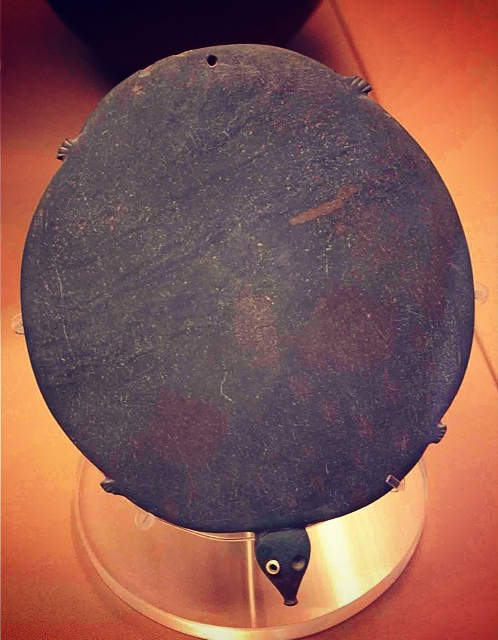
Mudstone palette in the form of a turtle, 20.2 × 16.2 × 0.7 cm, Naqada I, with inlaid bone eyes, one now missing; British Museum, EA37913.

=== Naqada II: geometric and zoomorphic forms ===
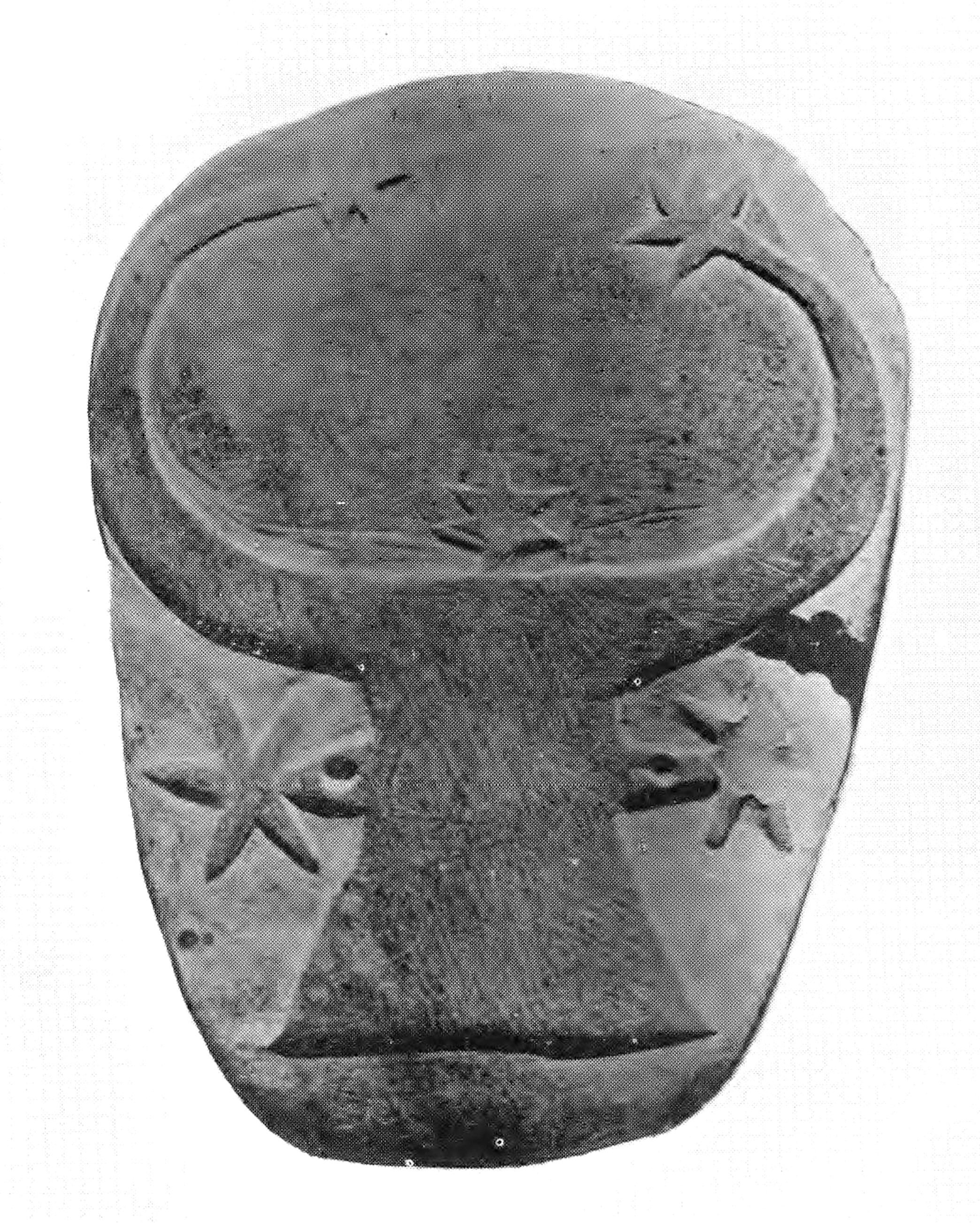
The Gerzeh Palette, from Tomb 59 at Gerzeh, Naqada IIC–IID1; its low-relief decoration consists of a stylised bovine head surrounded by five stars.

By the end of Naqada I, rhomboid palettes become less frequent, and during Naqada II zoomorphic forms representing especially fish, turtles and birds become common, together with shield-shaped palettes that often terminate in opposed bird heads. Hippopotamus, elephant and gazelle forms are much rarer; internal details are generally limited to the eye, which could be represented by a small ring of shell or bone, while fins, feet or tails could be indicated by incision. A hole near the edge occurs frequently and is interpreted as a means of suspension.

Among the decorated examples is the Gerzeh Palette, from Tomb 59 at Gerzeh, dated to Naqada IIC–IID1 and carved in low relief with a stylised bovine head surrounded by five stars. Miniature examples of Naqada I and II have also been described as "magic slates", but Stevenson notes that their materials and forms are the same as those of larger palettes and that their dimensions form a continuum, making a firm division between functional and non-functional objects arbitrary.

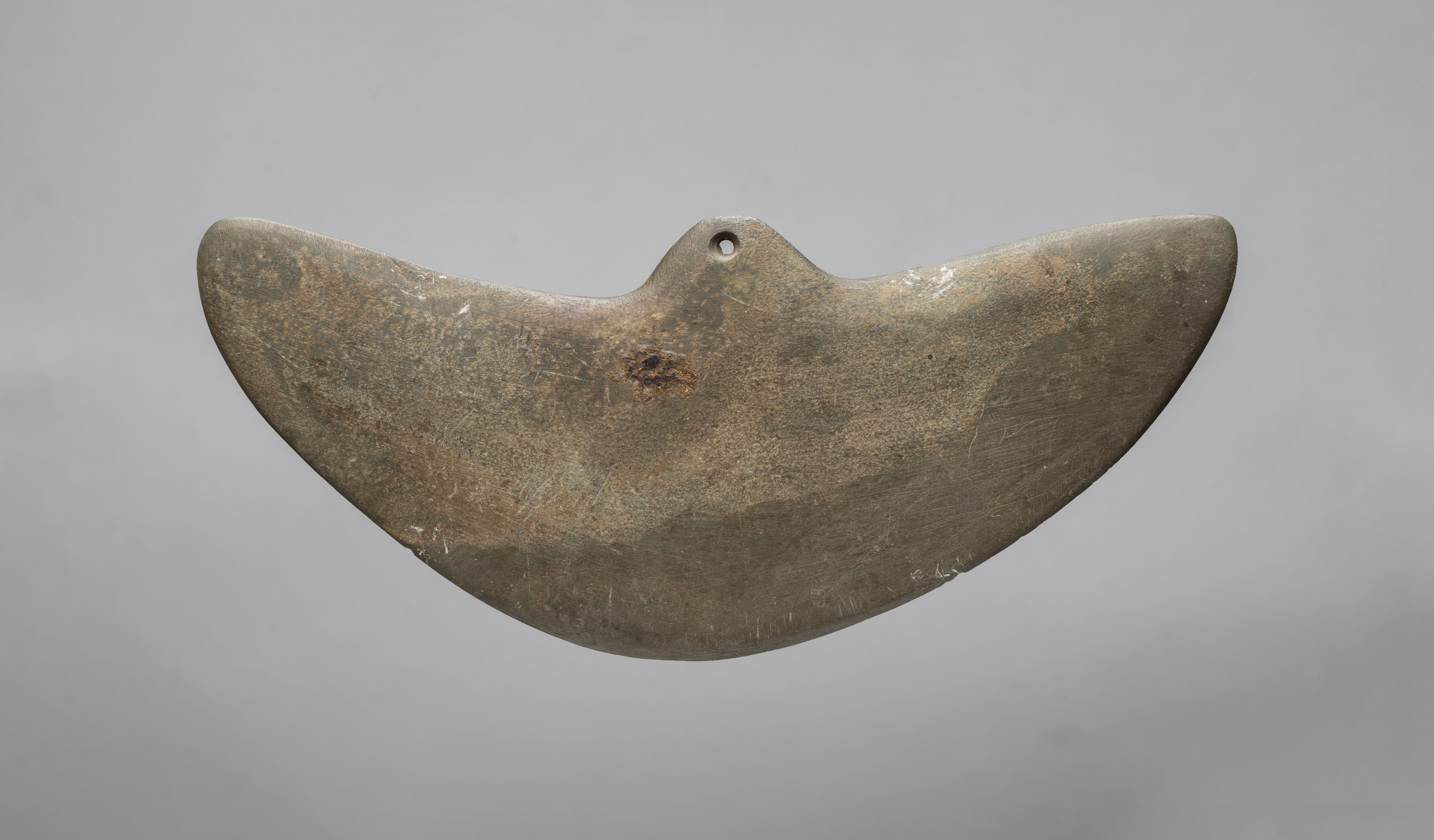
Greywacke cosmetic palette, 16.9 × 7.4 × 0.7 cm, Naqada IIB–IIC, 3650–3400 BCE; Museo Egizio, Turin, Suppl. 605.

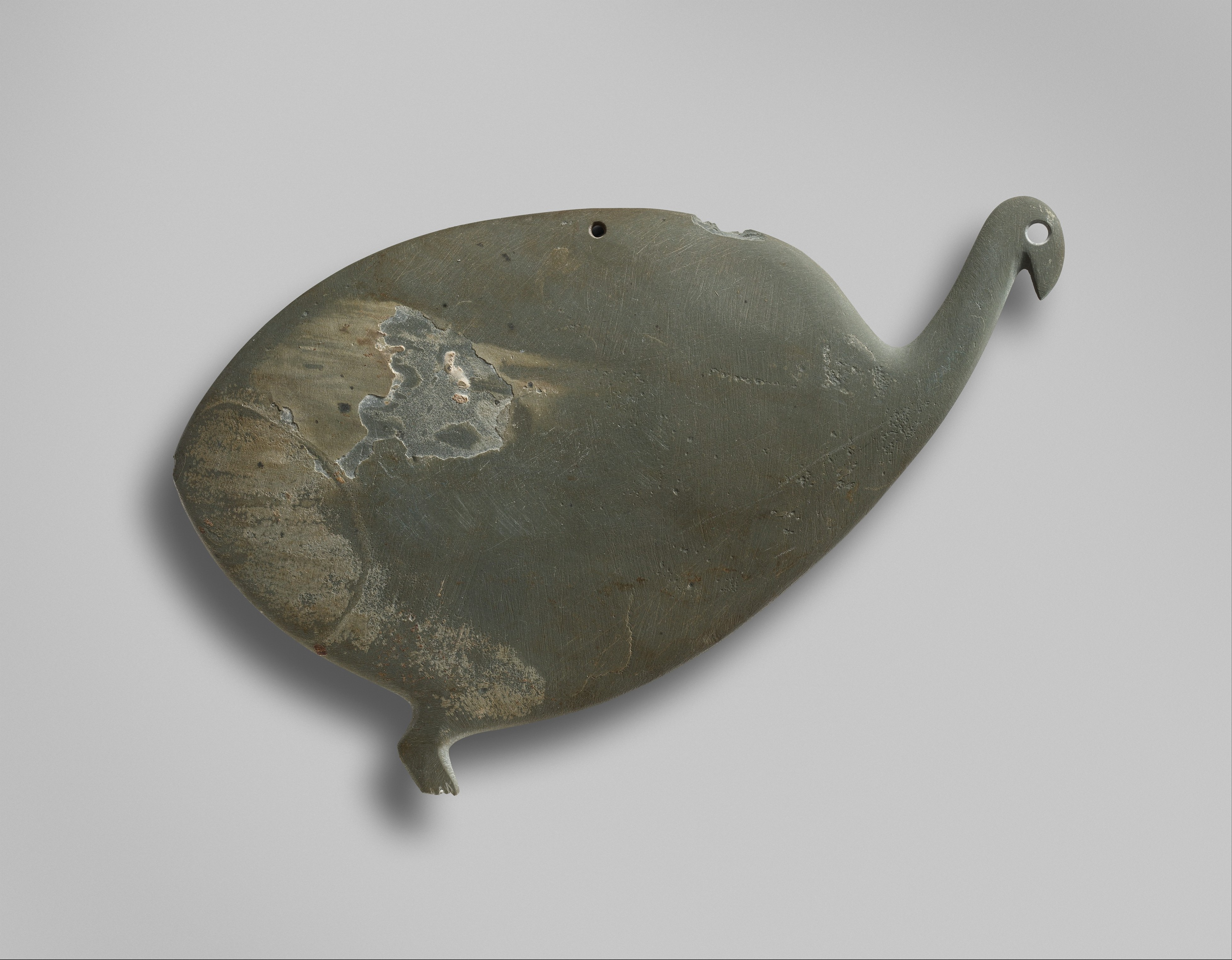
Greywacke palette in the form of a guinea fowl, 19.3 × 14.8 cm, Naqada II, c. 3500–3300 BCE; Metropolitan Museum of Art, 07.228.157.

=== Naqada III and ceremonial palettes ===
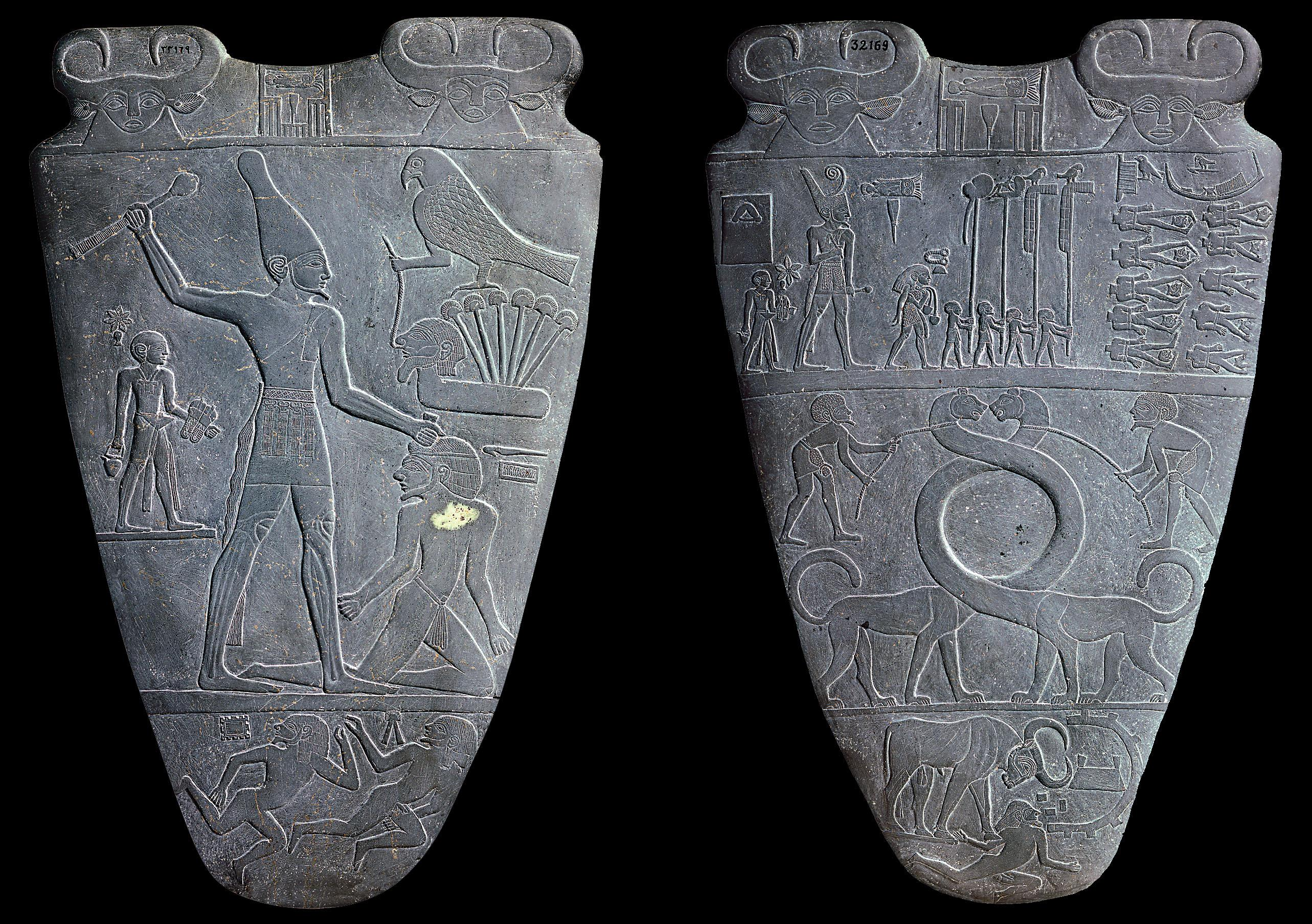
The two faces of the Narmer Palette, about 63 cm high, from the Main Deposit at Hierakonpolis; Egyptian Museum, Cairo (JE32169). Its relief scenes are organised in registers and include some of the earliest known hieroglyphic writing.

During Naqada III, zoomorphic palettes become less common, while rectilinear, circular and ovoid forms become more frequent, sometimes with incised lines along the edge; from Naqada IIIA2–B, ordinary palettes also become rarer and less elaborate. The same period saw the appearance of so-called ceremonial palettes, large or finely relief-carved objects that archaeological scholarship associates with the emergence of royal imagery and ideology; Stevenson records just over 25 complete and fragmentary examples. Many retain a circular bordered area derived from the grinding surface of smaller cosmetic palettes, although the ceremonial examples do not show traces indicative of grinding use.

The Narmer Palette, found in the so-called Main Deposit at Hierakonpolis and held by the Egyptian Museum in Cairo as JE32169, arranges its scenes in superimposed registers and bears some of the earliest known hieroglyphs; Stevenson places it among the latest ceremonial palettes. On one face Narmer wears the White Crown and strikes an enemy, while on the other he wears the Red Crown before rows of the dismembered bodies of defeated enemies; Wengrow notes that the object has been read both as a historical representation of political unification and in cosmological terms. The original provenance of most ceremonial palettes is unknown, and the Main Deposit represents the place of final deposition rather than evidence for where the Narmer Palette or the Two Dogs Palette was made or used.

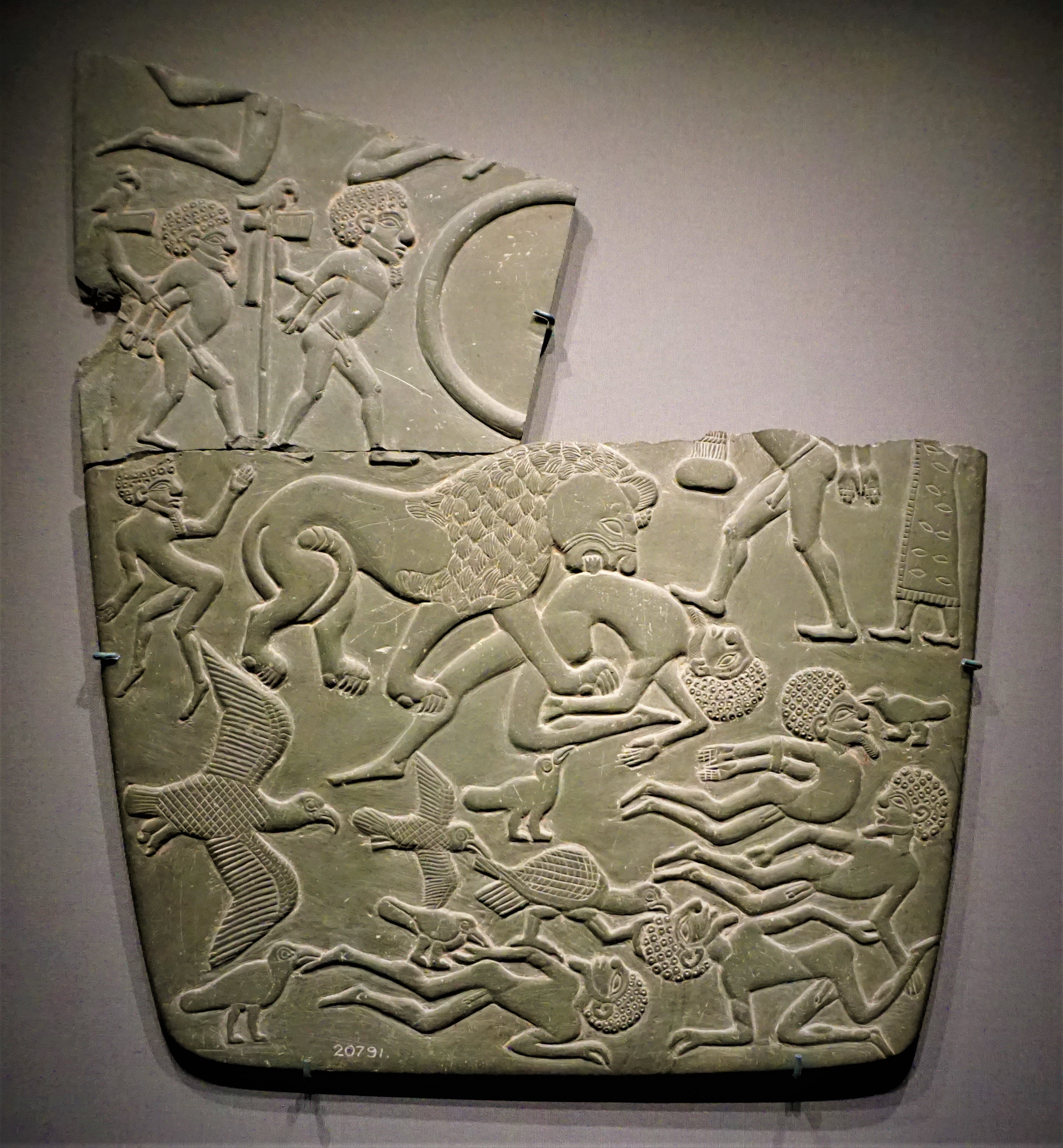
The Battlefield Palette, grey mudstone, Naqada III, c. 3100 BCE. The British Museum fragment EA20791 measures 19.6 × 28.7 × 1 cm and reaches 32.8 cm in height with the attached cast of the Ashmolean fragment; its two faces show prisoners and battle casualties, and two gerenuks browsing at a date palm.

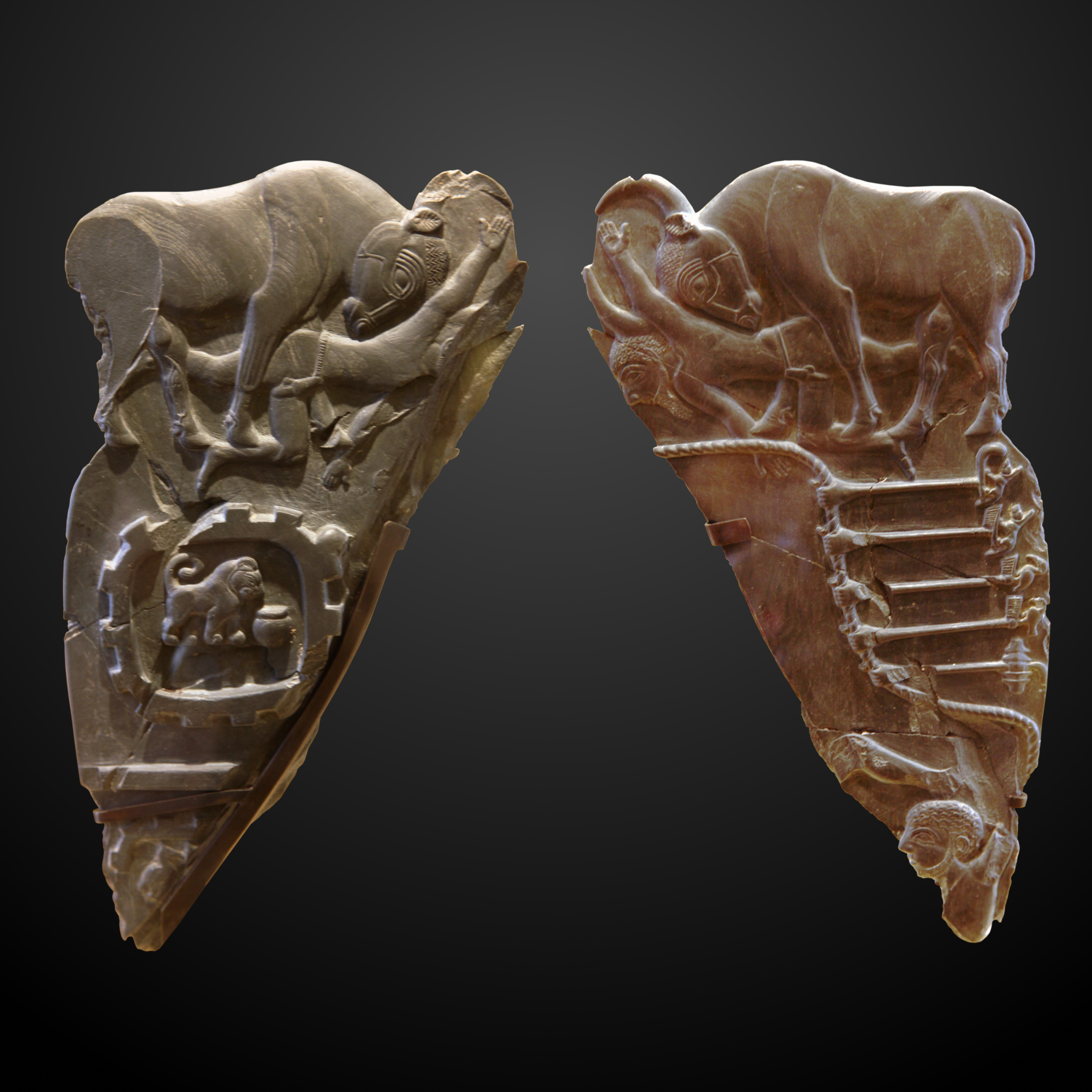
The Bull Palette, a greywacke low-relief fragment, 26.5 × 14.5 cm, Naqada IIIA–B, c. 3200–3100 BCE; Louvre Museum, E 11255. The surviving decoration includes a bull trampling a man, divine standards, two dogs, an ibis and a falcon.

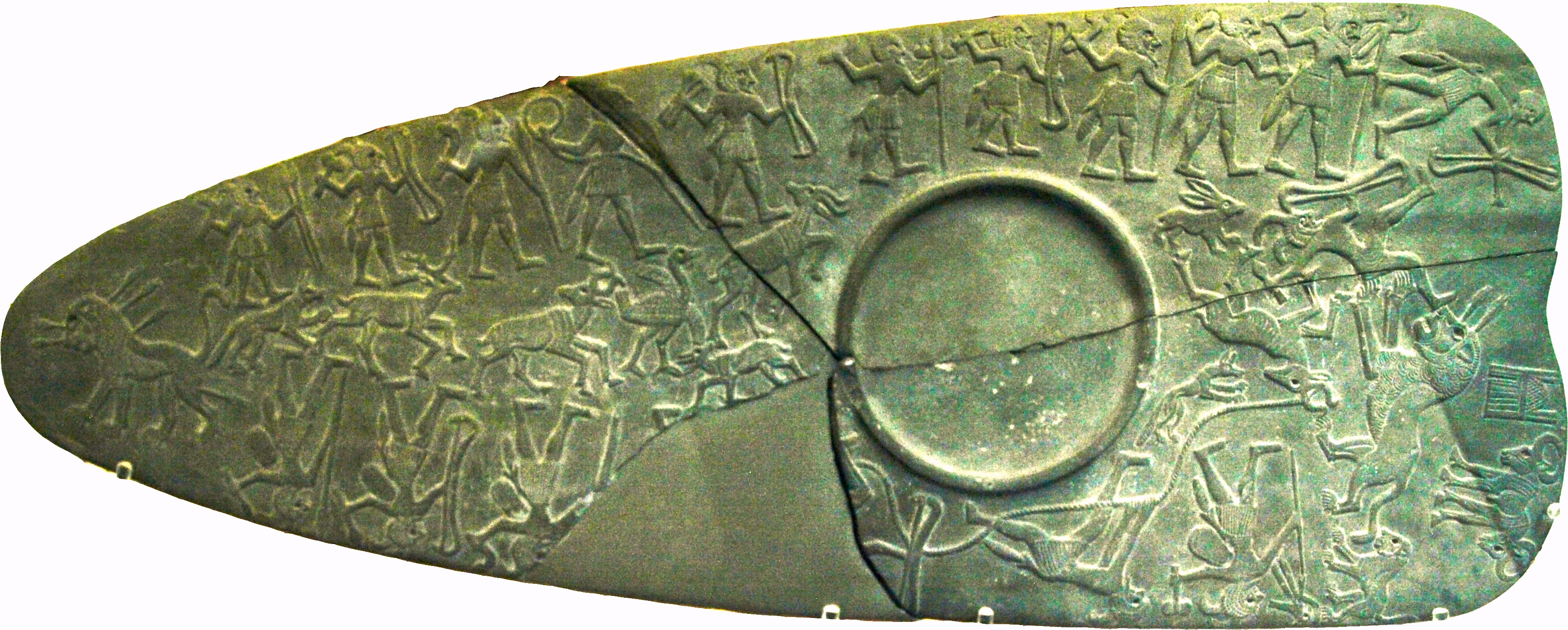
The Hunters Palette, grey mudstone, Naqada III. The group of surviving pieces and casts registered by the British Museum as EA20790/EA20792 measures 25.8 × 66.5 cm overall and is carved on one side with groups of hunters and wild animals; the reconstruction incorporates a cast of the Louvre fragment.

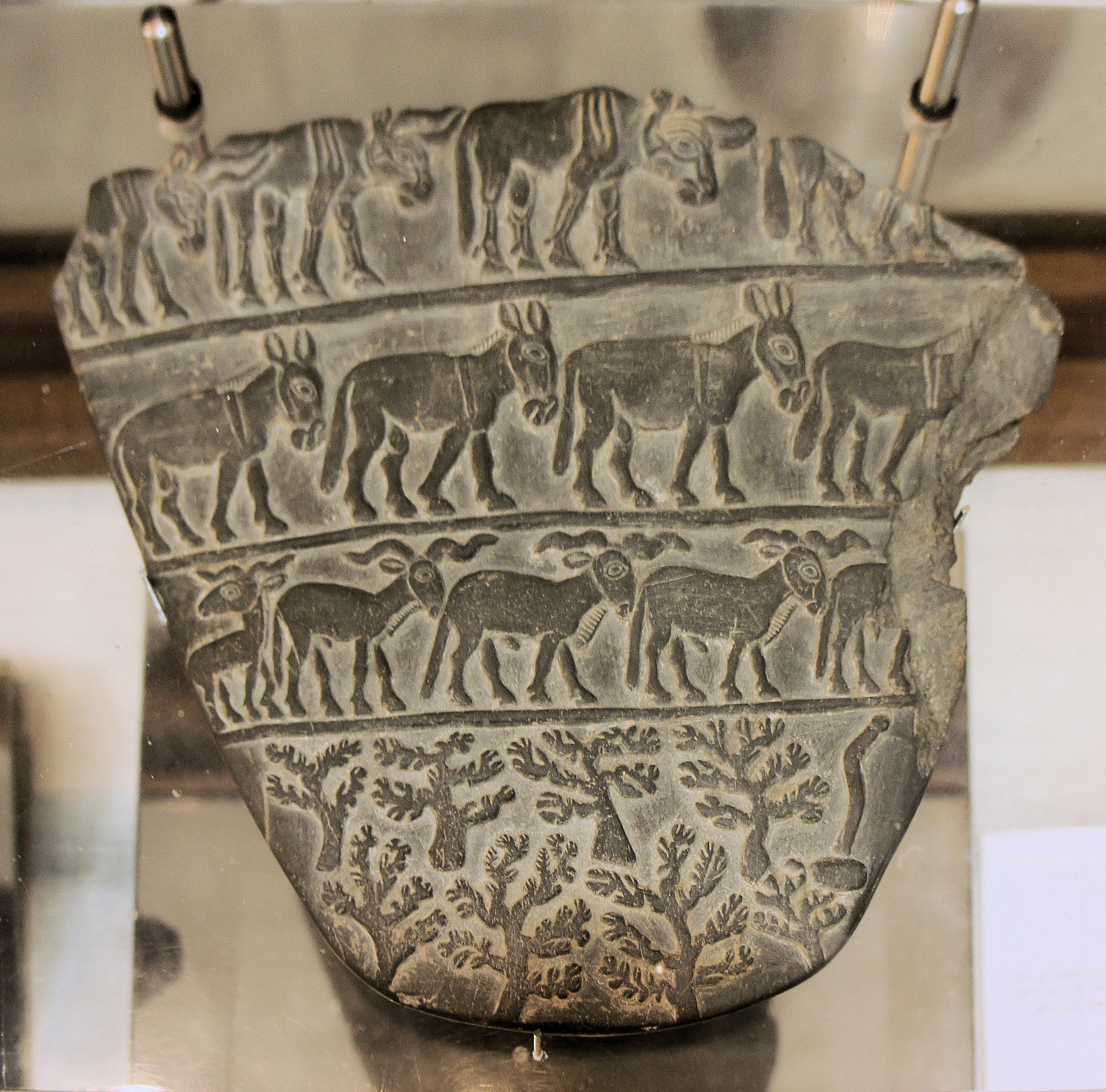
The Libyan Palette, a Naqada III ceremonial palette in the Egyptian Museum, Cairo, JE27434; it is also known as the "Cities Palette".

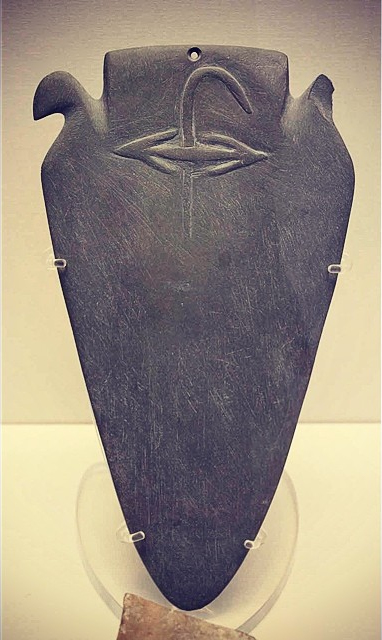
The Min Palette, mudstone, 29.2 × 15.3 cm, Naqada III, from El-Amra; British Museum, EA35501. It is tongue-shaped, with a piercing, two bird-head projections, one broken, and two hieroglyphic signs in relief.

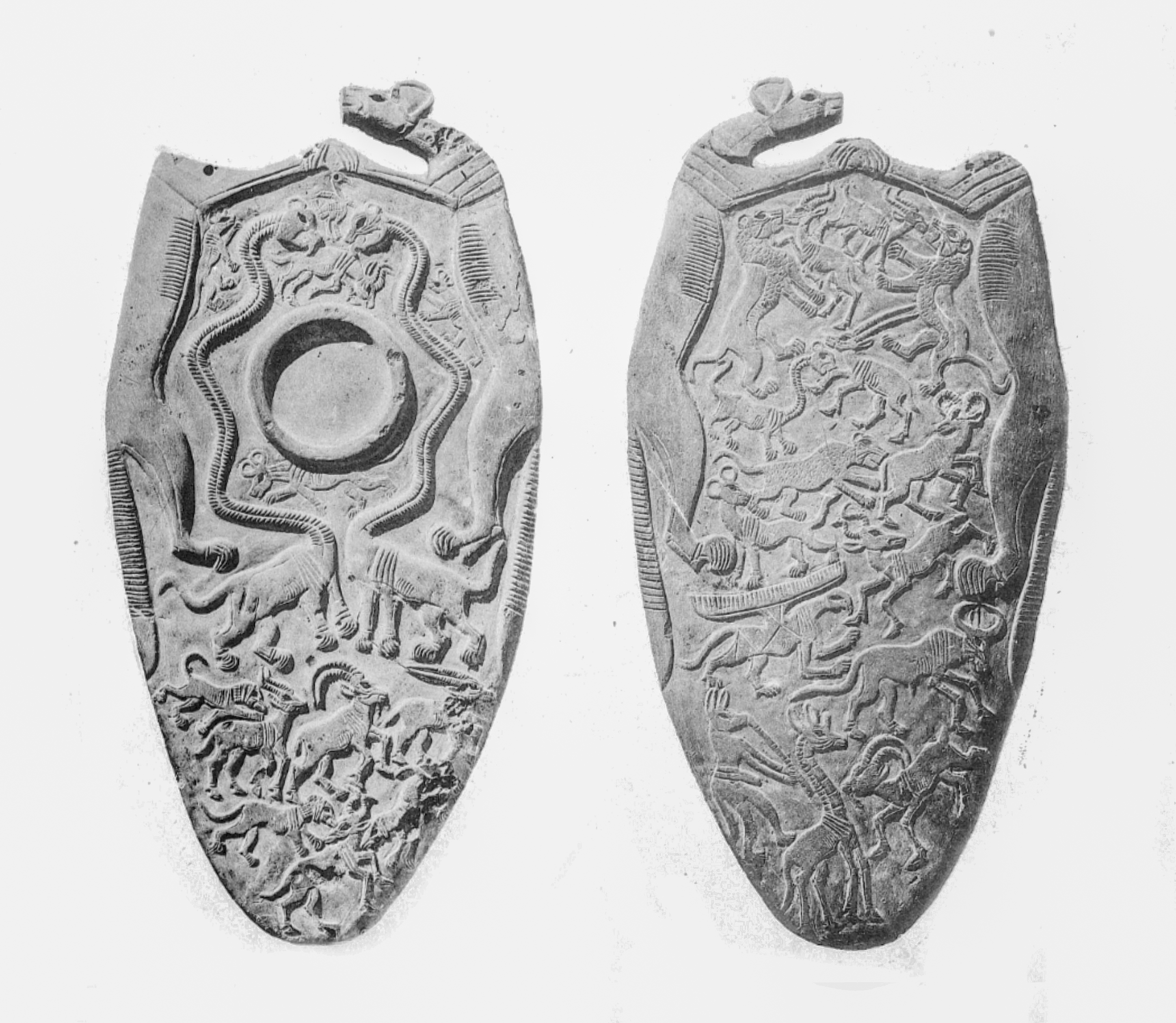
The Two Dogs Palette, siltstone, 42.5 × 22 cm, c. 3300–3100 BCE, from Hierakonpolis; Ashmolean Museum, AN1896-1908 E.3924. Both faces are carved in shallow relief with real and fantastic animals.

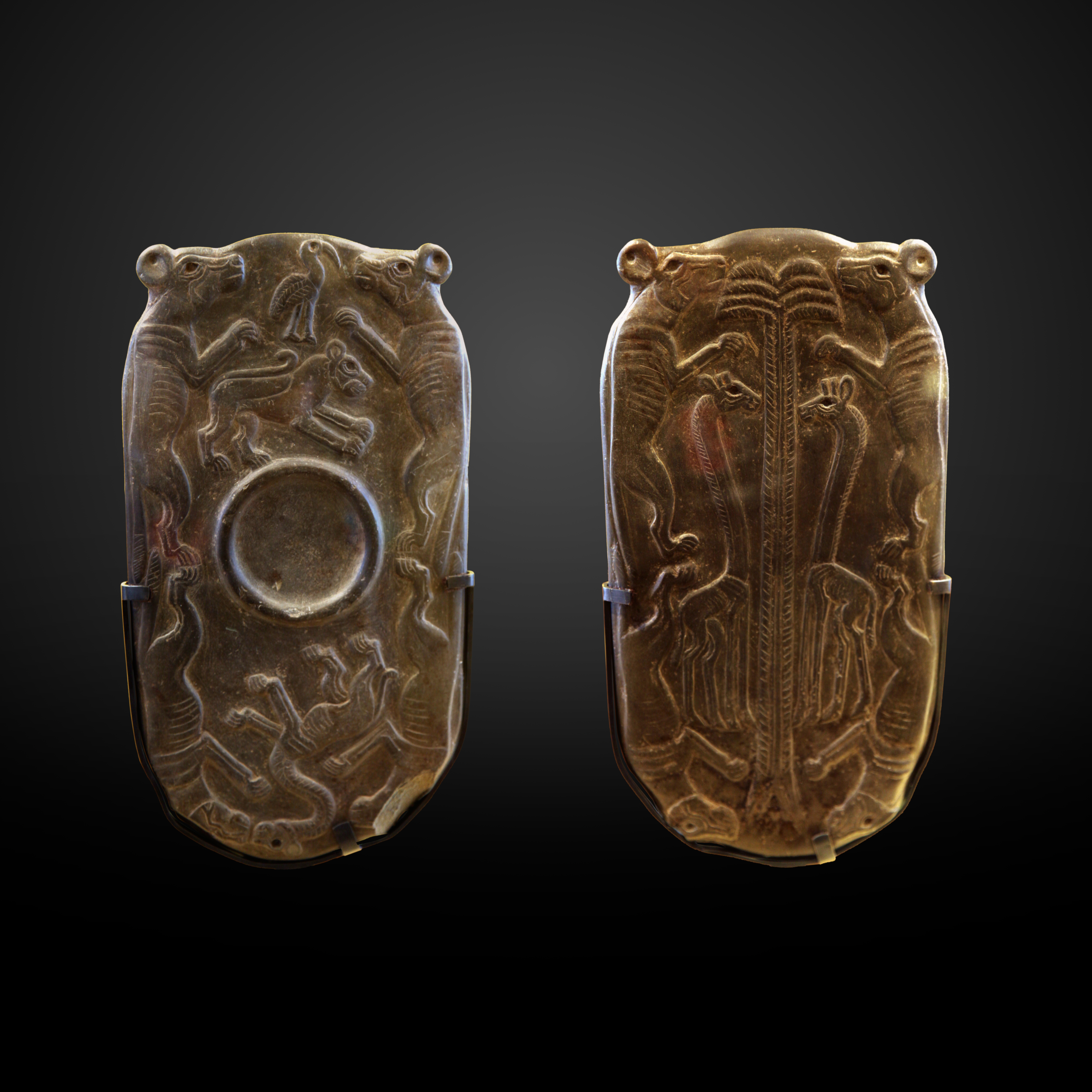
The Four Dogs Palette, greywacke carved in low relief, 32 × 17.7 × 1.8 cm, Naqada IIIA–B, c. 3200–3100 BCE; Louvre Museum, E 11052. The obverse bears four canids, an ibis, a lion and a hybrid animal; the reverse has four canids and two giraffes flanking a palm.

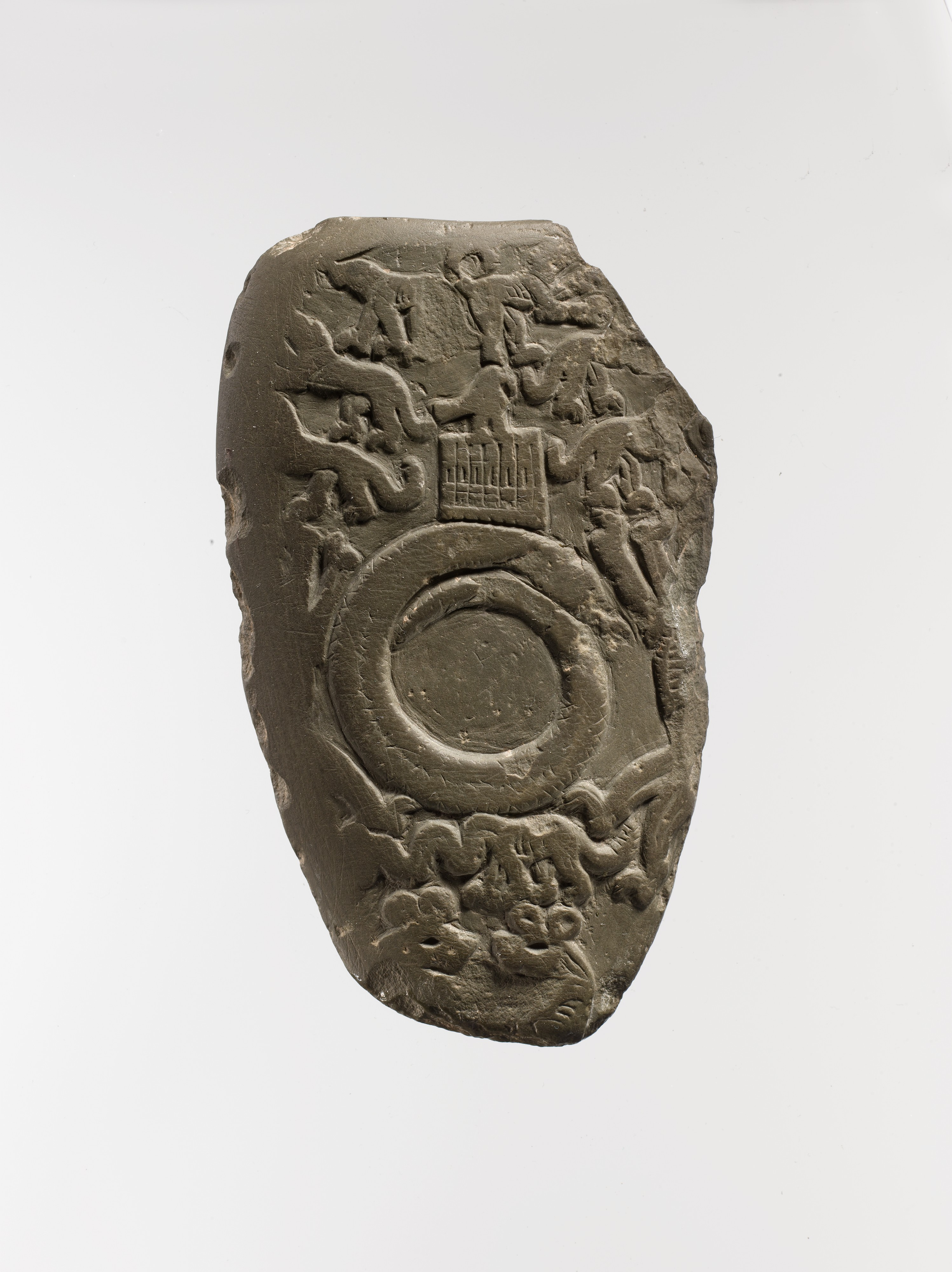
Greywacke fragment of a carved ceremonial palette, 9 × 5.5 × 1.1 cm, late Naqada III, c. 3200–3100 BCE; Metropolitan Museum of Art, 28.9.8.

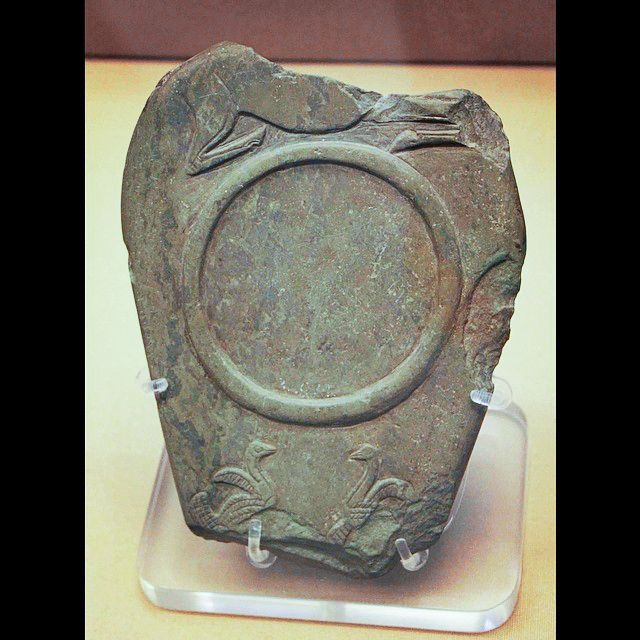
Fragment of a grey mudstone ceremonial palette, Naqada III; British Museum, EA32074. An antelope is carved at the top on both faces, while the obverse preserves part of a raised circular area.

=== Decline and later transformations ===
The use of ordinary and ceremonial palettes declined from the beginning of the First Dynasty, and flat, shaped grey-stone palettes disappeared as a distinct category by the middle of the dynasty. Implements for grinding cosmetics nevertheless continued to be used: thick rectangular palettes, often trapezoidal in section and provided with a rectangular depression, occur in Old Kingdom mastabas at Giza and in Middle Kingdom tombs at Beni Hasan.

== Outside Egypt ==
=== Southern Levant and Parthian Mesopotamia ===
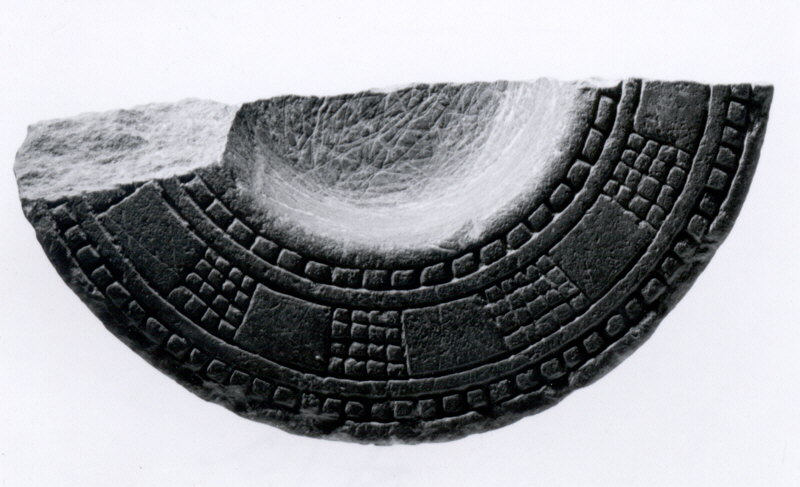
Stone cosmetic palette from Tawilan in Edom, c. 7th century BCE, 2.51 × 9.45 cm; Metropolitan Museum of Art, 1977.234.9.

Between about 1000 and 500 BCE, small concave vessels with diameters of 56–122 mm and heights of 10–39 mm are known from sites in Palestine and east of the Jordan; they were made in materials including glass, faience, basalt, flint, limestone and sandstone. They have been interpreted as containers for coloured cosmetic pastes applied to the face, but Thompson noted that this function had not been directly demonstrated. A stone example from Tawilan in the territory of Edom, dated to about the 7th century BCE, is held by the Metropolitan Museum of Art as 1977.234.9, while a stone palette from Mesopotamia in the Parthian period is dated to about the 1st century BCE–1st century CE.

=== Gandhara ===
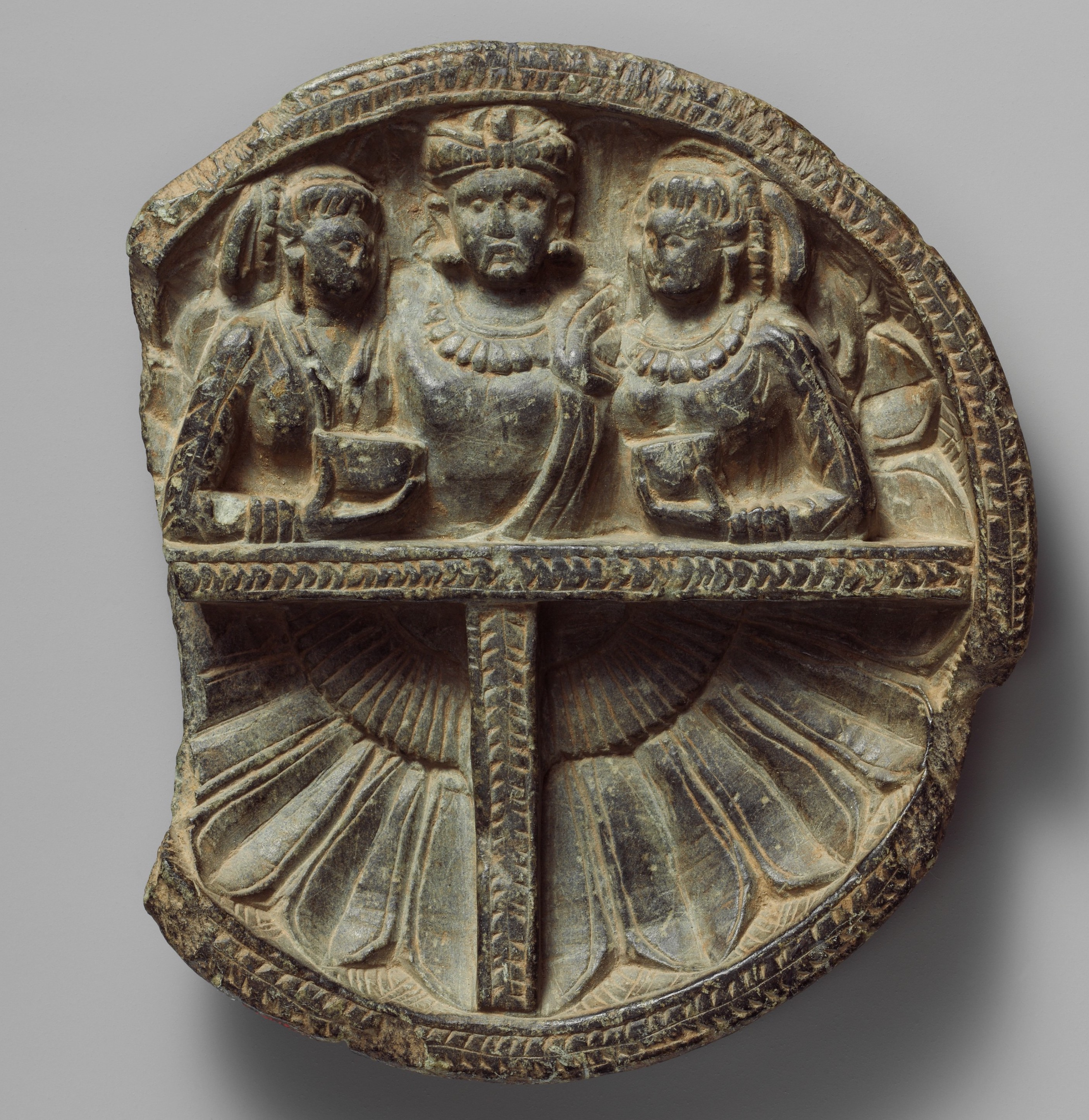
Schist stone palette with a drunken Herakles embracing two women, Gandhara, 1st century, diameter 15.6 cm; Metropolitan Museum of Art, 1987.142.40.

In Gandhara, the objects conventionally called palettes are small concave dishes, mostly of stone, concentrated in north-western Pakistan; a catalogue of 196 examples published in 2023 gives average dimensions of about 4 cm in height and 19 cm in diameter. Provenance is unknown for 112 of the 196 catalogued objects, which makes the dating of many examples uncertain. At Taxila, datable examples range approximately from 80 BCE to the 3rd century CE. Similar dishes found at Sirkap, in the Taxila area, came from contexts interpreted by the Metropolitan Museum of Art as suggesting use in domestic rituals, possibly connected with securing a favourable afterlife.

== See also ==
- List of ancient Egyptian palettes
- Beauty and cosmetics in ancient Egypt
- Predynastic Egypt
- Naqada I
- Naqada II
- Naqada III
- Narmer Palette

== Bibliography ==
- Baduel, Nathalie (2005). "La collection des palettes prédynastiques égyptiennes du Muséum (Lyon). Étude des objets (traces de fabrication et d'utilisation) et présentation des palettes et du fard prédynastiques dans leur contexte historique, archéologique, social et funéraire". Cahiers scientifiques du Muséum d'histoire naturelle de Lyon - Centre de conservation et d'étude des collections (in French). 9: 5–63. doi:10.3406/mhnly.2005.1341.
- Nikolaou, Christos (2023). "An Updated List of Gandhara Palettes and Their Utility for the Study of Hybridity". Journal of Open Humanities Data. 9: 1–6. doi:10.5334/johd.105.
- Stevenson, Alice (2009). "Palettes". UCLA Encyclopedia of Egyptology: 1–9.
- Thompson, Henry O. (1971). "Iron Age Cosmetic Palettes". Annual of the Department of Antiquities of Jordan. 16: 61–70.
- Wengrow, David (2001). "Rethinking 'Cattle Cults' in Early Egypt: Towards a Prehistoric Perspective on the Narmer Palette". Cambridge Archaeological Journal. 11 (1): 91–104. doi:10.1017/S0959774301000051.
