= Dynasty 0 =

Period of ancient Egyptian history

Dynasty 0 of Egypt
- c. 3300 BCE–c. 3100 BCE
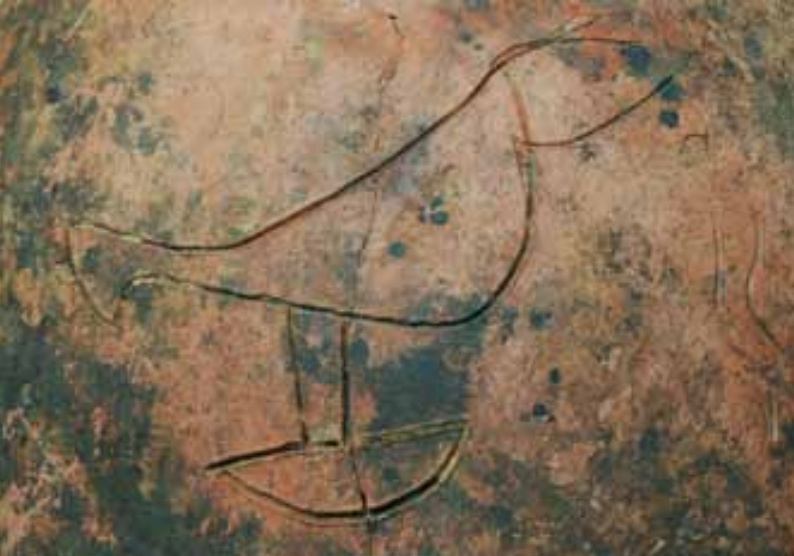
- Name of King Iry-Hor, Dynasty 0, Eastern Kom, Tell el-Farkha.
- Capital: Tjenu, Nekhen, Nubt
- Common languages: Egyptian language
- Religion: Ancient Egyptian religion
- Government: Absolute monarchy
- Historical era: Bronze Age
  - Established: c. 3300 BCE
  - Disestablished: c. 3100 BCE
Preceded by	Succeeded by
Predynastic Egypt	First Dynasty of Egypt

Dynasty 0, Dynasty Zero, or the Protodynastic period are the terms used to describe the kings of Egypt during the Naqada III period of Egypt. These kings ruled over part or all of Egypt, with this dynasty ending with the legendary king Menes, who is usually associated with Narmer or Aha. This period saw a rise in Egyptian royalty, leading to Egyptian unification by Menes.

During this period, names were written in serekhs on a variety of surfaces, usually on jars and in tombs. This period is characterized by constant conflict with the people in the Nile Delta, likely to control trade routes with the Levant.

== History ==
=== Upper Egypt ===
==== Unification of Upper Egypt ====
It is likely several kingdoms existed before Upper Egypt was unified by Scorpion I. Scorpion I was originally from a kingdom based in Tjenu, and during his reign, he conquered Naqada, as shown by a graffito in the Theban Desert Road Survey. He was buried in Abydos in the famous tomb U-j, dating to about 3300 BC. His tomb had ivory labels seemingly mention the towns of Per-Wadjet and Per-Bast, showing he likely invaded the Nile Delta during his reign. Scorpion I's succession is unknown, but Günter Dreyer claims that his successor was named Falcon, based off ivory tags in U-j and inscriptions on the Tehenw Palette.

==== Control during Iry-Hor's reign ====
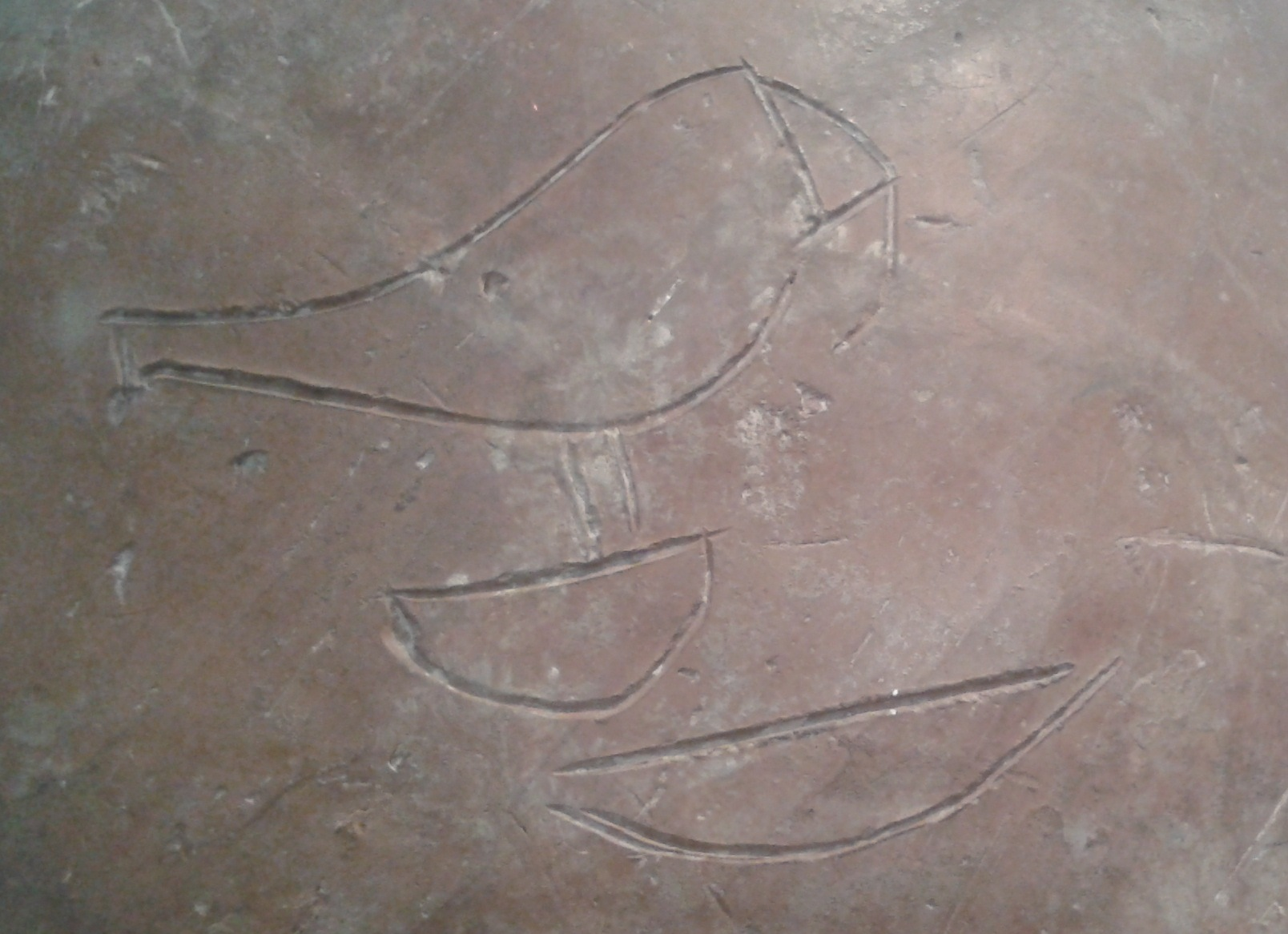
Serekh of Iry-Hor

The strength of Upper Egypt likely increased during Iry-Hor's reign in the early half of the 32nd century BC. Iry-Hor is well attested throughout Upper Egypt, with 27 times throughout Abydos alone. Iry-Hor's second-most northernmost attestation is in the Sinai, referencing Inebu-hedj, likely constituting that he had control of the Nile Delta, or at least the eastern portion. It is likely that this portion of land was acquired late in his reign due to the low amount of attestations there, compared with his successor, Ka. Dreyer claims that Iry-Hor was preceded by Crocodile, who is unattested outside of Tarkhan, suggesting that there may have been a separate kingdom that ended there.

==== Ka's reign in Egypt ====
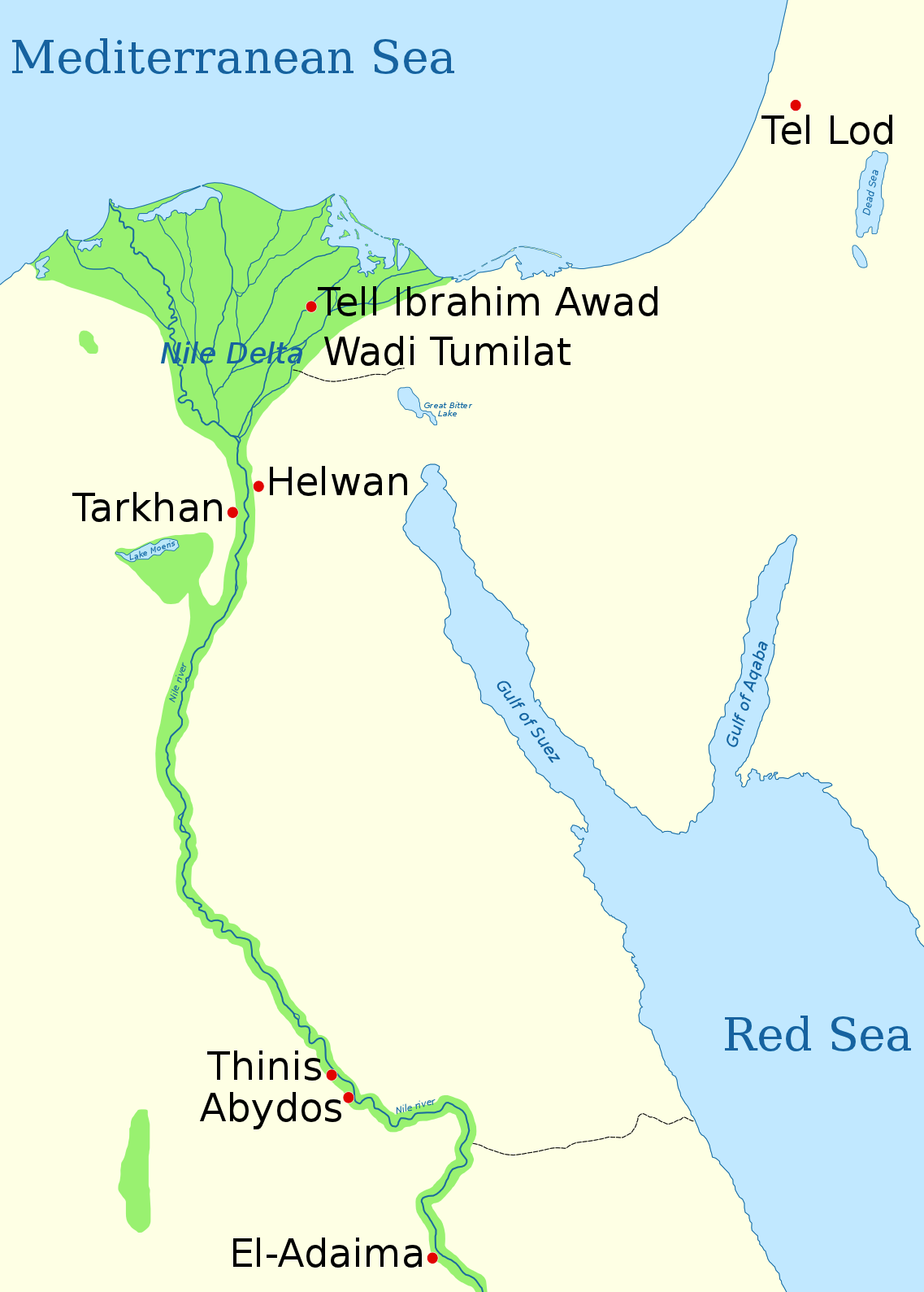
Map of the locations where Ka's serekhs have been found

Ka ruled over Thinis in the first half of the 32nd century BC and was buried at Umm el-Qa'ab. He most likely was the immediate successor to Iry-Hor and was succeeded either by Narmer or by Scorpion II. He is the earliest known Egyptian king with a serekh inscribed on a number of artifacts. This may thus be an innovation of his reign. Ka is one of the best attested predynastic kings with Narmer and Scorpion II. Beyond Abydos, he is attested in the predynastic necropolis of Adaima in Upper Egypt and in the north in Tarkhan, Helwan, Tell Ibrahim Awad, Tell el-Farkha (Eastern Nile Delta), Wadi Tumilat and as far north as Tel Lod in the Southern Levant.

The number of artifacts bearing Ka's serekh found outside Abydos is much greater than that of his predecessor. This may be the sign of an increasing influence and perhaps conquest of larger portions of Egypt by the Thinite kings.

==== Conquest of the Nubians ====
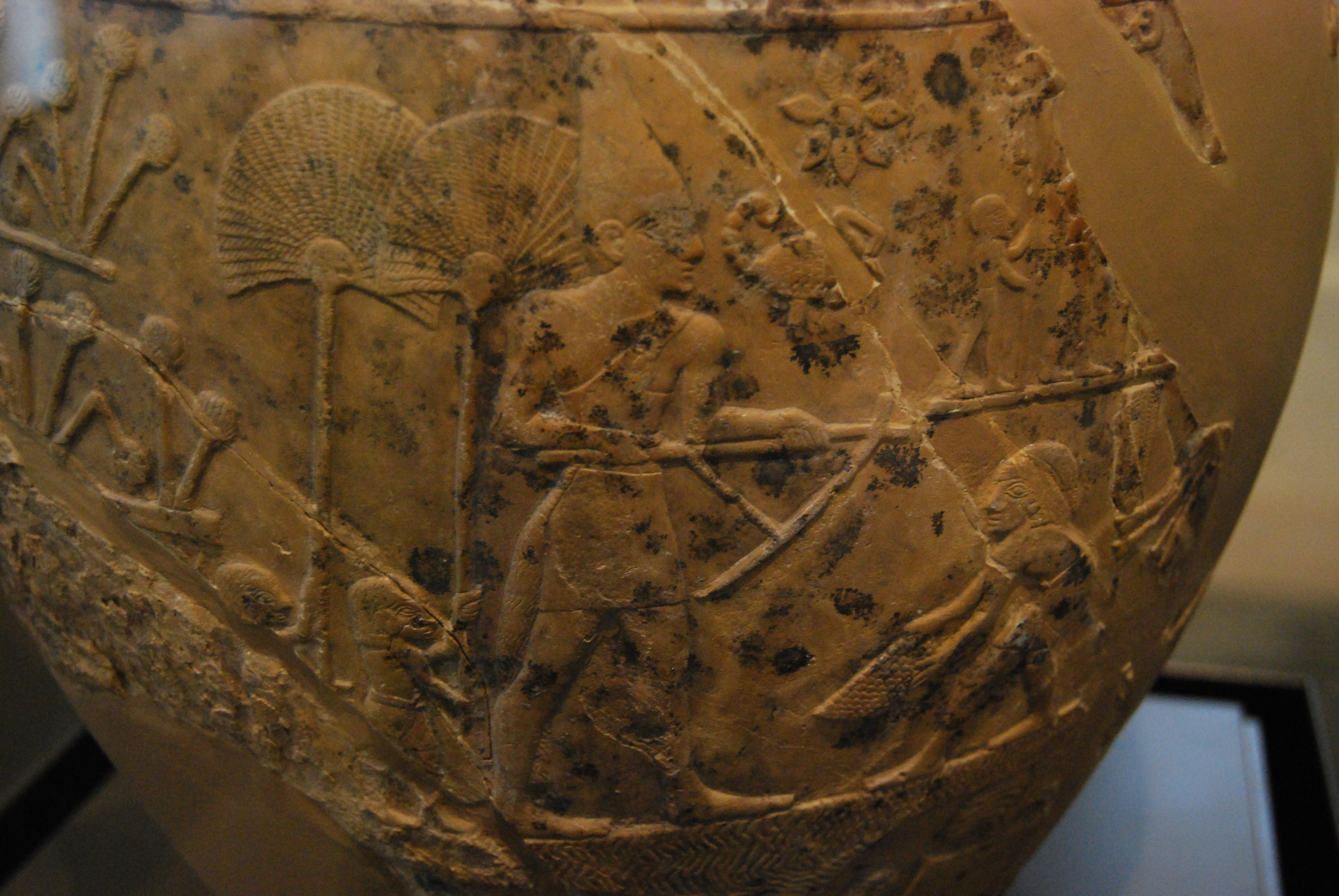
Scorpion II on the Scorpion Macehead

Scorpion II is known to have activity in Lower Nubia. The minor Gebel Sheikh Suleiman, found in the Second Cataract depicts a Scorpion figure attacking people, possibly pointing to an attack on the Nubians during his reign. This may be supported by a rock inscription bearing a scorpion figurine with a rosette above it, found in the Wadi al-Malik, further south than the Second Cataract. Jiménez-Serrano expands upon this saying that the decrease in grave goods in the royal Qustul tombs of L22 and L5 can be attributed to Scorpion II's conquest.

=== Lower Egypt ===
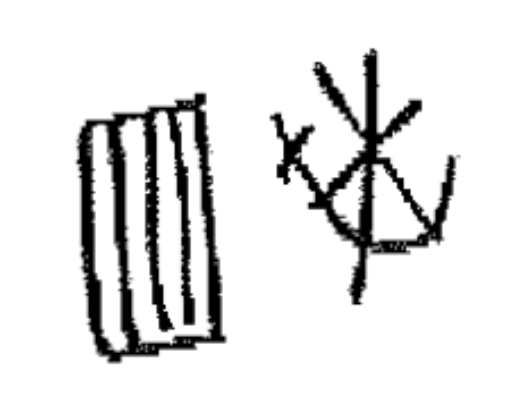
Anonymous serekh found in el-Beda, which may be read as Ka-Neith.

==== Early Protodynastic Period ====
The earliest signs of royal activity in Lower Egypt come from serekhs which do not have a name compartment. Dubbed as "anonymous serekhs," these serekhs might possibly be read by reading the symbols next to the name. Out of the 24 known anonymous serekhs, only one has had an attempted reading. Throughout Lower Egypt, there was regional kingdoms throughout. City-states may have been based in Tarkhan, Buto, and Helwan, and there may have been kingdoms based in the Southern and Eastern regions of the Delta.

==== Unification of Lower Egypt ====
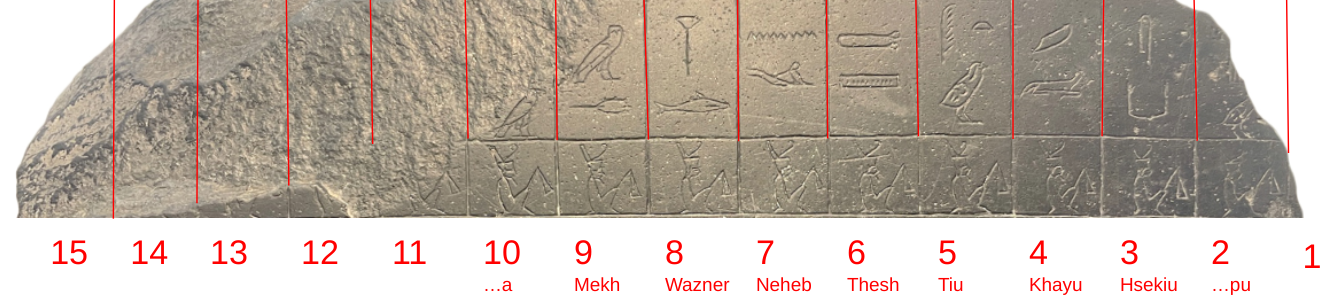
All 15 pre-dynastic Pharaohs on the Palermo Stone

It is possible that there was a unified Lower Egyptian kingdom, that Narmer took over to unite Egypt fully. The Palermo Stone lists fifteen kings that may have ruled during this period, though only seven have fully readable names. The names that survive on the stone are ...pu, Hsekiu, Khayu, Tiu, Tjesh, Neheb, Wazner, Mekhet, and ...a. The Palermo Stone is the only place that these kings are attested, which might mean these kings might be mythical. The final king of this kingdom may have been Wash.

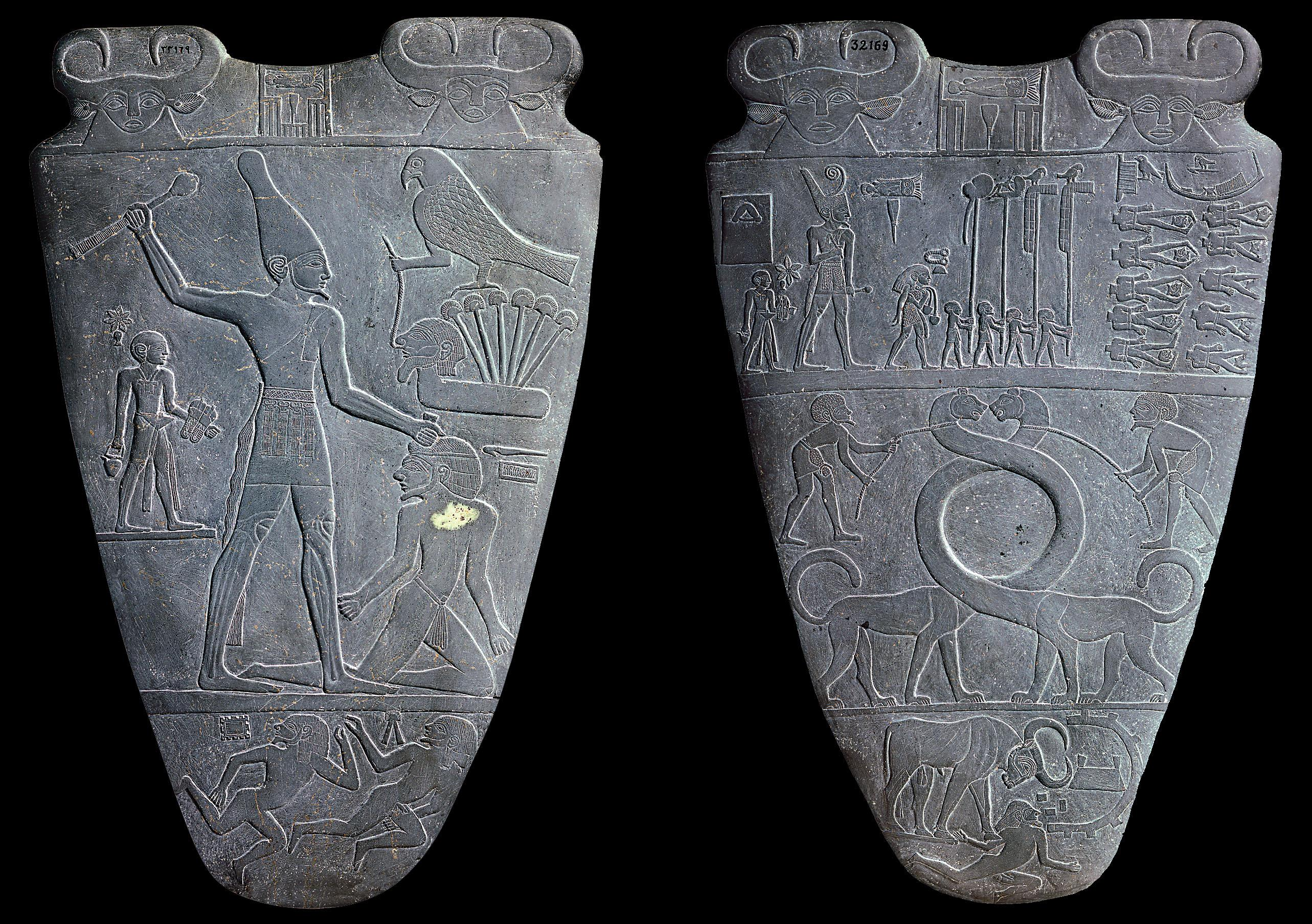
The Narmer Palette, depicting Narmer on both sides.

=== Unification of Egypt ===
Following Scorpion II's or Ka's death, his successor, Narmer, was crowned king in c. 3100 BC. Narmer's historical identity is disputed, with some claiming he was the same person as Scorpion II, and some people claiming he was Menes. If indeed he is Menes, then he most likely would have had his capital at Tjenu.

At some point throughout his reign, he attacked the Kingdom of Lower Egypt. This is depicted on the Narmer Palette, showing Narmer about to smite the pharaoh Wash. This may also be depicted on a seal found in Nekhen. The palette also shows Narmer wearing both the Deshret crown of Lower Egypt and the Hedjet crown of Upper Egypt.

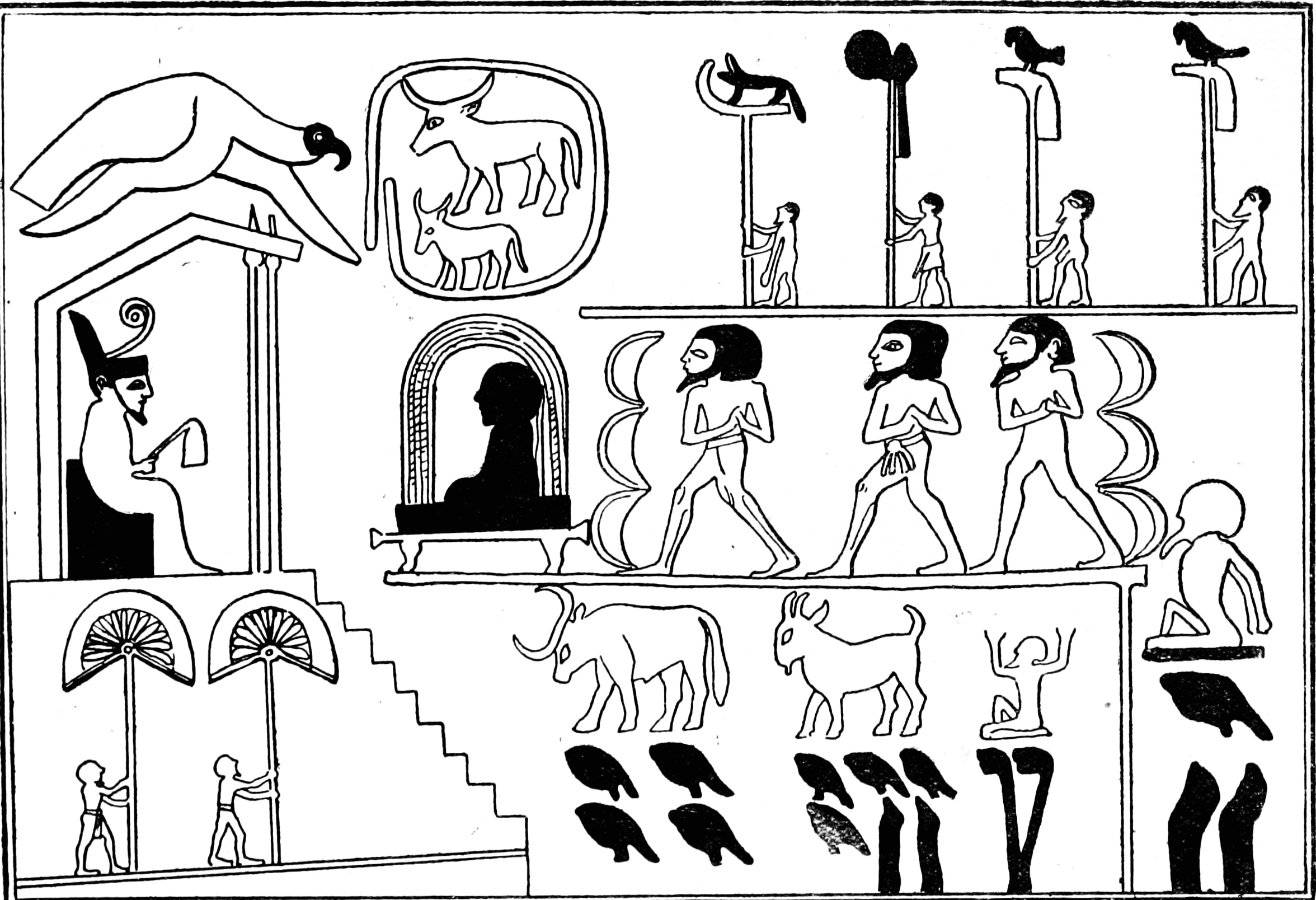
Drawing of the Narmer Macehead

Following the unification, there was a festival where Narmer was presented the plundered goods of Lower Egypt, depicted on the Narmer Macehead. The plunder totaled at 120,000 captives, 400,000 cattle, and 1,422,000 goats. During Narmer's reign of a unified Egypt, Narmer attacked the Tehenu people, as shown by a year label. Narmer also seems to have also attacked the Kharga Oasis during his reign, as he is attested there, possibly overthrowing the regional king there, A.

During Narmer's reign, the peak of Egyptian presence in Canaan occurred. There is evidence of Egyptian presence in Canaan before Narmer, as Ka is attested as far north as Tel Lod. Narmer seemingly had the strongest control over Canaan, as he is better attested in the region than Ka. When Narmer died c. 3085 BC – c. 3050 BC, his successor, Hor-Aha, became pharaoh, ending Dynasty 0.

== List of pharaohs ==
=== Upper Egypt ===
Image	Name	Reign	Notes	Reference
	Scorpion I	c. 3300 BC	Possibly founded Dynasty 0 by unifying Upper Egypt.	
	Falcon	c. 3300 - c. 3170 BC	Existence disputed.	
	"Min standard + plant"	c. 3300 - c. 3170 BC	Existence disputed.	
	"N.2"	c. 3300 - c. 3170 BC	Existence disputed.	
	"N.3"	c. 3300 - c. 3170 BC	Existence disputed.	
	Lion	c. 3300 - c. 3170 BC	Existence disputed.	
	Double Falcon	c. 3200 BC	Not confirmed if Double Falcon actually reigned in Upper Egypt. He is best attested in the Delta, with few attestations outside of the region.	
	Hut-Hor?	unknown	Recorded on two pottery fragments found in Tell el-Farkha and Umm el-Balad respectively. The name's reading has been suggested as both "Ḥr-Ḥw.t" and "Ḥw.t-Ḥr", the latter interpretation may refer to the goddess Hathor.	
	"B"	unknown	The identity of this king is disputed, but he may be the same as Ka.	
	Iry-Hor	c. 3170 BC	May also be read as Ro.	
	Ka	c. 3150 BC	May also be read as Sekhen.	
	Scorpion II	c. 3140 BC	May be read as Weha or Serq. Thought to have originated from Buto, based off ivory tags.	
	A	c. 3100 BC	May have been a local king at the Kharga Oasis, as that is where his only attestation is.	
	Narmer	c. 3100 BC	May be identifiable with Menes, the first king of the First Dynasty. Fully unified Egypt during his reign.	

=== Lower Egypt ===
Image	Name	Reign	Notes	Reference
	Hedju-Hor	unknown	May have only controlled the eastern part of the Delta, as that is the only place he is attested. Debated on if Hedju-Hor was in this dynasty. May be the same person as Wash.	
	Ny-Hor	unknown	May have only controlled the southern part of the Delta, as that is the only place he is attested, excluding a single stone vessel found in Naqada. May be the same person as Narmer.	
	Ni-Neith	unknown	May have been a local king at Helwan, as that is his only attestation.	
	Hat-Hor	unknown	May have only controlled the southern part of the Delta, as that is the only place he is attested.	
	Hut-Hor?	unknown	Recorded on two pottery fragments found in Tell el-Farkha and Umm el-Balad respectively. The name's reading has been suggested as both "Ḥr-Ḥw.t" and "Ḥw.t-Ḥr", the latter interpretation may refer to the goddess Hathor.	
	name destroyed	unknown	Only known from the Palermo Stone.	
	[...p]w	unknown	Only known from the Palermo Stone.	
	Hsekiu	unknown	Only known from the Palermo Stone.	
	Khayu	unknown	Only known from the Palermo Stone.	
	Tiu	unknown	Only known from the Palermo Stone.	
	Thesh	unknown	Only known from the Palermo Stone.	
	Neheb	unknown	Only known from the Palermo Stone.	
	Wazner	unknown	Only known from the Palermo Stone.	
	Mekh	unknown	Only known from the Palermo Stone.	
	[...]a	unknown	Only known from the Palermo Stone.	
	name destroyed	unknown	Only known from the Palermo Stone.	
	name destroyed	unknown	Only known from the Palermo Stone.	
	name destroyed	unknown	Only known from the Palermo Stone.	
	name destroyed	unknown	Only known from the Palermo Stone.	
	name destroyed	unknown	Only known from the Palermo Stone.	
	[...]-Neith	c. 3240 BC	This is an example of an anonymous serekh. The reading and rank of the name is disputed, with Clédat reading the name reads as "Ka-Neith" and was a queen, and Raffaele reading the name as "Bark-Neith," but does not take a stance on the rank.	
	Double Falcon	c. 3200 BC	Reading of name is unknown. Possibly another example of an anonymous serekh. Dreyer believes this reads ḏw (Dju), while Jiménez-Serrano believes it reads hr.wy (Horway).	
	Crocodile	c. 3180 BC	May be read as Shendjw. Likely a local king based in Tarkhan, as that is the only location he is attested. Dreyer places him just before Iry-Hor in his reconstructions based off guiding inscriptions. Wilkinson believes he was a usurper.	
	Iry-Hor	c. 3170 BC	May have only controlled the eastern half of the Delta, as well as Upper Egypt, as he is attested in the Sinai and his successor Ka is well attested throughout the area.	
	Ka	c. 3150 BC	May have only controlled the eastern half of the Delta, as well as Upper Egypt. Reading of name uncertain, his name might be read as sḫn (Sekhen).	
	Scorpion II	c. 3140 BC	May be read as Weha or Serq. Thought to have originated from Buto, based off ivory tags.	
	Wash	c. 3100 BC	Existence disputed, may be the same person as Hedju-Hor. Perhaps the final king in a unified Lower Egyptian Kingdom, if it existed.	
	Narmer	c. 3100 BC	May be identifiable with Menes, the first king of the First Dynasty. Fully unified Egypt during his reign.	
