= A (pharaoh) =

Early Dynastic pharaoh of Ancient Egypt

- The serekh of A

Pharaoh
Royal titulary
Horus name
A
G5	D36
- Dynasty: Dynasty 00

A was the name of an Early Dynastic pharaoh of Ancient Egypt. His name is known from a graffito serekh carved into a sandstone outcropping 10 to 12 kilometers south-west of Umm el-Dabadib at the Kharga Oasis in the Western Desert. The presence of the serekh shows evidence of royal activity in the far reaches of the Western Desert as early as the protodynastic period.

== Discovery ==
During the 2004 season of the North Kharga Oasis Survey (NKOS), a serekh was discovered on the north-eastern face of a sandstone massif under the direction of Dr. Salima Ikram. It was isolated near the Darb Ain Amur, the ancient caravan route that connected the Kharga Oasis via the site of Umm el-Dabadib and Ain Amum to the Dakhla Oasis. The serekh was located among other groups of graffiti with different styles and depths of cut, implying that they were from different time periods.

== Serekh ==
The serekh is surmounted by a falcon, as is conventional for serekhs, and contains a single sign. The sign is an arm, or A (D36 in Gardiner's sign list). This name does not correspond to any other known Early Dynastic ruler. One of the legs of the falcon reaches into the serekh, and the crouching position of the falcon is typical of serekhs from the Dynasty 0 or the First Dynasty. Thus, it would seem that the serekh contains the Horus name 'A' of a previously unattested king belonging to Dynasty 0 or the First Dynasty. Surrounding the serekh on the sandstone massif are illustrations of various animals including a crocodile, a giraffe, a hippopotamus, an ostrich, a cow or bull, and a possibly pregnant oryx.
