= Iry-Hor =

Ruler of Ancient Egypt

- Ro, Ra, Irj-Hor, Iri(-Hor)
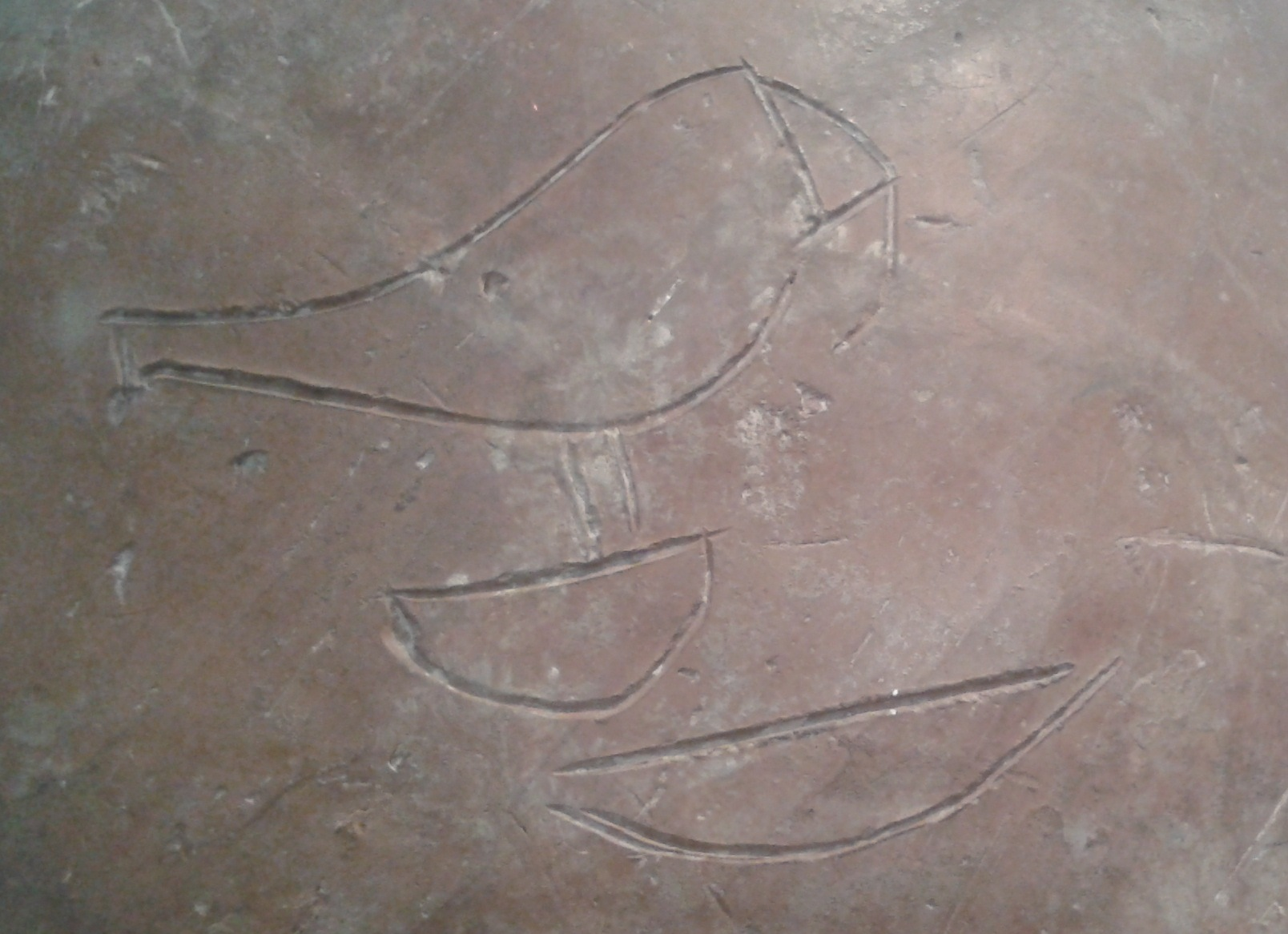
- Signs r-Ḥr inscribed on a large vessel from the tomb of Iry-Hor, Ashmolean Museum

Pharaoh
- Reign: c. 3170 BC; Naqada IIIB2
- Predecessor: Double Falcon? Crocodile? Hat-Hor?
- Successor: Ka?
Royal titulary
Horus name
Iry-Hor
r-Ḥr
Companion of Horus
G5 r or G5 r H_SPACE r
- Burial: Chambers B1 and B2, Umm el-Qa'ab, Egypt
- Dynasty: Dynasty 0

Iry-Hor (or Ro; fl. c. 3170 BC) was a predynastic king of Upper Egypt during the 32nd century BC. Excavations at Abydos in the 1980s and 1990s and the discovery in 2012 of an inscription of Iry-Hor at Wadi Ameyra in the Sinai confirmed his existence. Iry-Hor is the earliest ruler of Egypt known by name and is sometimes cited as the earliest-living historical person known by name.

== Name ==
Iry-Hor's name is written with the Horus falcon hieroglyph (Gardiner sign G5) above a mouth hieroglyph (Gardiner D21). While the modern reading of the name is "Iry-Hor", Flinders Petrie, who discovered and excavated Iry-Hor's tomb at the end of the 19th century, read it "Ro", which was the usual reading of the mouth hieroglyph at the time. Alternatively, Ro can be rendered as Ra.

Given the archaic nature of the name, the translation proved difficult and, in the absence of a better alternative, Ludwig D. Morenz proposed that the literal translation be retained, giving "Horus mouth".

In the 1990s, Werner Kaiser and Günter Dreyer translated Iry-Hor's name as "Companion of Horus".

== Identity ==
Iry-Hor's name

=== Controversy regarding his social status ===
Until 2012, the name of Iry-Hor had not been found in or next to a serekh, so the identification of Iry-Hor as a king was controversial. Toby Wilkinson contended that Iry-Hor was not a king, but a slave of a king, translating the signs as "Property of the king". Egyptologists Jürgen von Beckerath and Peter Kaplony also initially rejected the identification of Iry-Hor as a king and proposed instead that the known inscriptions refer to a private person whose name is to be read Wer-Ra, wr-rꜣ (lit. "great mouth"), i.e. reading the bird above the mouth-sign as the swallow hieroglyph G36 rather than the Horus falcon. They translated the name as "Spokesman" or "Chief". Egyptologists Flinders Petrie, Laurel Bestock and Jochem Kahl nonetheless believed that he was indeed a real ruler.

Following the excavations at Abydos and the discovery of an inscription of Iry-Hor in the Sinai in 2012, Wilkinson's hypothesis is now rejected by most Egyptologists and Iry-Hor is widely accepted as a predynastic king of Egypt.

=== Resolution ===
Dreyer's excavations of the necropolis of Abydos revealed that Iry-Hor was, in fact, well attested there, royalty (most probably a king), with over 27 objects bearing his name and that his tomb was of royal proportions. Two of these inscribed jars are now housed in the Ashmolean Museum, Oxford. Furthermore, in 2012 an inscription mentioning Iry-Hor was discovered in the Sinai at Wadi Ameyra, the inscription comprising furthermore an archaic empty serekh on the right of Iry-Hor's name. The inscription mentions the city of Memphis, pushing back its foundation to before Narmer and establishing that Iry-Hor was already reigning over it. Following this discovery, most Egyptologists, including G. Dreyer and the discoverers of the inscription, Pierre Tallet and Damien Laisney, now believe that Iry-Hor was indeed a king. Continuing excavations of Iry-Hor's tomb at Abydos by Dreyer established that the tomb was of similar dimensions and layout as those of Ka and Narmer and must, therefore, have belonged to a king. This was consequently accepted by von Beckerath and Iry-Hor is now the first entry in the latest edition of von Beckerath's Handbook of Egyptian Pharaohs.

== Reign and attestations ==
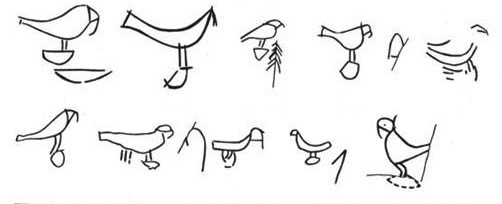
Name of Iry-Hor as found in Abydos

Iry-Hor was most likely Ka's immediate predecessor and thus would have reigned during the early 32nd century BC. He probably ruled from Hierakonpolis over Abydos and the wider Thinite region and controlled Egypt at least as far north as Memphis, since the Sinai rock inscription relates a visit of Iry-Hor to this city. The Egyptologists Tallet and Damien Laisney further propose that Iry-Hor also controlled parts of the Nile Delta.

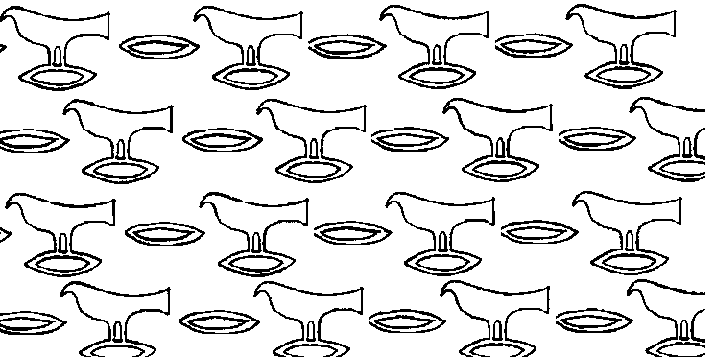
Clay seal with the signs r-Ḥr

He was buried in the royal cemetery of Umm el-Qa'ab near Ka, Narmer and the First Dynasty kings. Iry-Hor's name appears on clay vessels from his tomb in Abydos and a clay seal with the hieroglyphs for r-Ḥr was found in Narmer's tomb and may refer to Iry-Hor. In total, no fewer than 22 pottery jars incised with Iry-Hor's name have been found in Abydos as well as at least five ink-inscribed fragments and a cylinder seal. A similar seal was also found far to the north in the tomb Z 401 of Zawyet el'Aryan in Lower Egypt. An incision on a spindle whorl found in Hierakonpolis during James E. Quibell and Petrie excavations there in 1900 may refer to him. Finally, the discovery of a rock inscription of Iry-Hor in the Sinai at Wadi Ameyra constitutes his northernmost attestation. The inscription shows the name of Iry-Hor on a boat, next to the word Inebu-hedj meaning "white walls", the ancient name of Memphis. Three serekh inscriptions of Iry-Hor were found at the Nile Delta site of Tell el-Farkha. Two other unknown serekhs were also found there. All were found in graves.

== Tomb ==
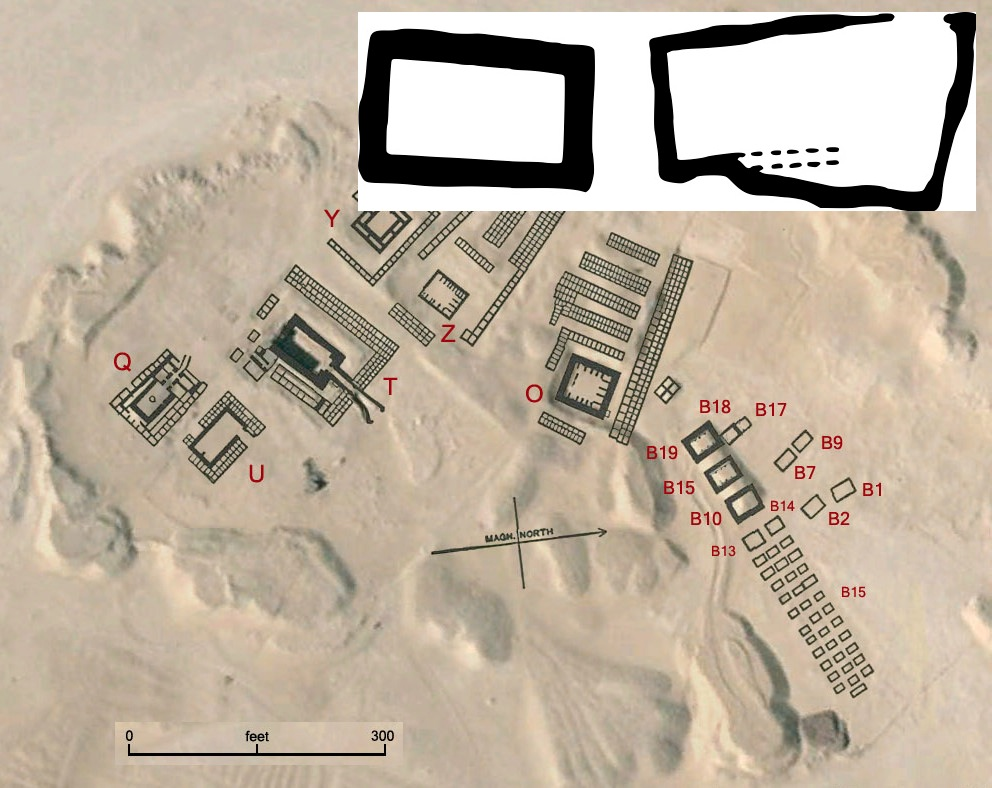
Iry-Hor's tomb at the Umm el-Qa'ab comprises two separate chambers B1 and B2, shown in inset. Iry-Hor's tomb is located close to Ka's (B7, B8, B9) and Narmer's tombs (B17, B18).

Iry-Hor's tomb is the oldest tomb of the Abydos necropolis B in the Umm el-Qa'ab. It comprises two separate underground chambers B1 (6 m × 3.5 m) and B2 (4.3 m × 2.45 m) excavated by Petrie in 1899 and later by Werner Kaiser. A further chamber, now known as "B0", was uncovered during re-excavations of Iry-Hor's tomb in the 1990s. These chambers have a size similar to those found in the tombs of Ka and Narmer. No superstructure, if there ever was one, survives to this day. Chamber B1 yielded jar fragments incised with his name. Chamber B2 produced another incised jar fragment, a seal impression, several ink inscriptions and vessel fragments bearing the names of Ka and Narmer. Parts of a bed were also found onsite.

== Bibliogrophy ==
- Begon, M. (2018). "Une mention d'Iry-Hor dans le sud du désert Oriental". NeHet, 2, pp. 31–36.
- Omar, Nageh (2022). "A Historical and Archaeological Study of the King Iry-Hor". Journal of Archaeology & Tourism, 1(1). doi:10.21608/jatmust.2022.253375.

== See also ==
- Enheduanna, possibly the oldest known author
- Naqada III, also called Dynasty 0
- Kushim, supposedly the earliest known recorded name of a person in writing
- Enmebaragesi

Preceded by Scorpion I? Double Falcon?	King of Thinis; Protodynastic	Succeeded by Ka?
