= Ni-Neith =

Predynastic Egyptian king

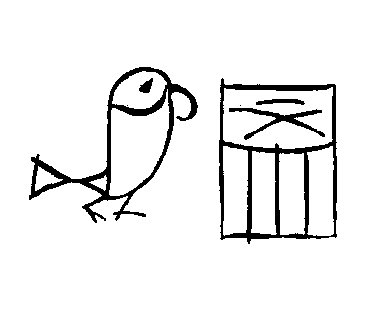
- Serekh of Ni-Neith

Pharaoh
- Reign: c. 3230 BC?
- Predecessor: Unknown
- Successor: Hat Hor?
Royal titulary
Horus name
Hor Ni-Neith
G5	n R25
- Dynasty: Dynasty 0

Ni-Neith (or Hor-ni-Neith) was possibly an ancient Egyptian king (pharaoh) of the Dynasty 0 during the Predynastic epoch. Information about his family and his chronological position is currently unknown. Ni-Neith is known so far only by two clay inscriptions on burned vases, which come from the grave 257 in Helwan. The reading of the name is not certain due to the negligent execution; the Egyptologists Edwin van den Brink and Christiane Köhler are convinced of the reading as "Ni-Neith". A more precise time assignment is still pending.

== See also ==
- List of pharaohs
