= Hedju-Hor =

Egyptian ruler

- Hor-Hedju, Hedju Hor
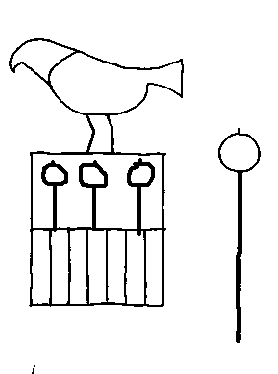
- A clay cutting of a hieroglyph of Hedju-Hor

Pharaoh
- Successor: Ny-Hor?
Royal titulary
Horus name
Hedju-Hor
Ḥr.(w)-ḥḏw
G5	HD HD HD	HD
- Dynasty: Dynasty 0 - (disputed)

Hedju-Hor was a ruler in northern Egypt from the Predynastic Period whose name means 'the maces of Horus'. As very little information is known about him, this has caused a debate among historians regarding his social status.

== Social status ==
Hedju-Hor is only known from two clay jugs on which his serekh appears: one from Tura in the eastern Nile Delta and one from Abu Zeidan on the northeastern tip of the Nile Delta. Egyptologist Wolfgang Helck held him as a Pharaoh of Dynasty 0 and identified him with Wash, who is known as the ruler defeated by Narmer on the Narmer Palette. This opinion was also later shared by historian Edwin van den Brink. By contrast, Toby Wilkinson and Jochem Kahl both argue that Hedju-Hor was not a pre-dynastic Pharaoh but, rather, a ruler of a small proto-state of the pre-dynastic era and have attributed to him the title King. Hedju-Hor also has no known tomb and is not found in the text of the Palermo Stone, which is a stone listing the oldest kings of Ancient Egypt.
