= Wash (pharaoh) =

Possibly an ancient Egyptian predynastic ruler

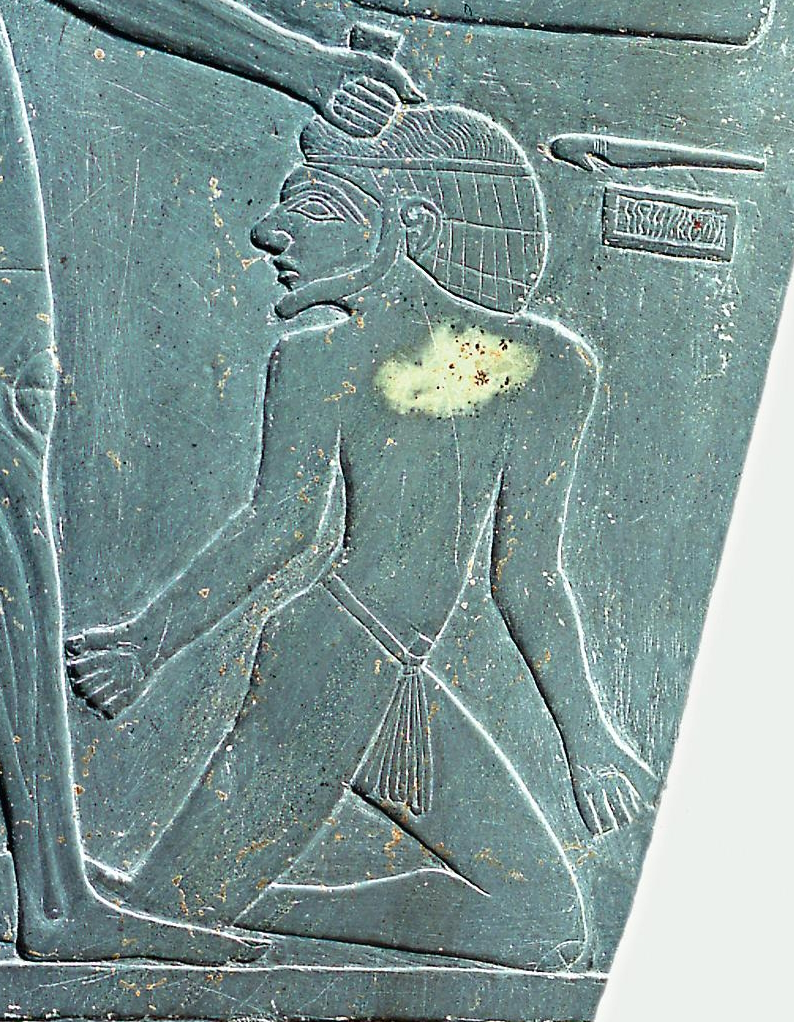
- King Narmer defeating Wash, Narmer Palette

Pharaoh
- Predecessor: unknown
- Successor: Narmer
Royal titulary
Horus name
T21 N37

Wash was possibly a pharaoh from the Predynastic Period in Ancient Egypt, approximately 5,000 years ago. As Wash is known only through his appearance as a captive of the pharaoh Narmer on the eponymous palette, his existence is contested.

== Background ==
Wash's historical existence is uncertain. The siltstone object on which he appears was discovered by British archeologists James E. Quibell and Frederick W. Green. They excavated the pallet during their 1897–98 dig season at the Temple of Horus at Nekhen. The reverse of the Palette depicts a kneeling captive, "un-Egyptian in appearance", about to be clubbed by the far larger figure of Narmer. Just as Narmer has a rebus representing his name carved next to him on the front of the palette (a catfish above a chisel), two primitive hieroglyphs appear near the captive. These are small images of a harpoon and a lake. Scholars have considered this harpoon-and-lake rebus as either a representation of the Harpoon nome, a community in the Northwestern Nile Delta next to the Libyan borders, or the captive's personal name. If the latter is the case then the prisoner's name can be read as Wash or Washi.

If Wash was a historical figure he may have been the last ruler of a Lower Egyptian dynasty based at Buto. Indeed, Narmer's fame rests on being the Upper Egyptian pharaoh to defeat the last Lower Egyptian pharaoh. However, rather than recording this historical event the palette may simply depict an allegory for Narmer's excellence and right of command, with the figure of Wash having been recruited to the task.

Archaeologist Edwin van den Brink argued that another predynastic Lower Egyptian ruler, Hedju Hor, is the figure depicted as Wash. Van den Brink based this argument on the similarities between Hor's own heraldic crest, his serekh, and the carving above Wash on the Narmer palette depicting Horus leading a ship out of papyrus reeds with a rope through the nose of its male figurehead.
