= Early Dynastic Period =

Early Dynastic Period may refer to:

- Early Dynastic Period (Egypt)
- Early Dynastic Period (Mesopotamia)
