= Hat-Hor =

Egyptian ruler

- Hat Hor, Hor-Hat
- Serekh of Hat-Hor

Pharaoh
- Reign: Naqada IIIb
- Predecessor: Ny-Hor?
- Successor: Iry-Hor?
Royal titulary
Horus name
Hat-Hor
T3	n
- Dynasty: Dynasty 0

Hat-Hor, or Hor-Hat, is a possible pharaoh or king of Dynasty 0 who ruled around the Naqada IIIb period.

He is known only from two inscriptions: one inscription found in the eastern Nile Delta and a piece of pottery from Tura.

- his name on a vase found in tomb 1702 of the necropolis of Tarkhan. This inscription has an image of a city that looks like Memphis but lacking a hawk identifier. However, the reading and interpretation of his name is not clear.
- a second inscription from Tura.

== See also ==
- List of pharaohs
