= Early Dynastic Period of Egypt =

Era after unification, c. 3150–2686 BC

- c. 3150 BC–c. 2686 BC
- Pschent, the "double crown" of Egypt

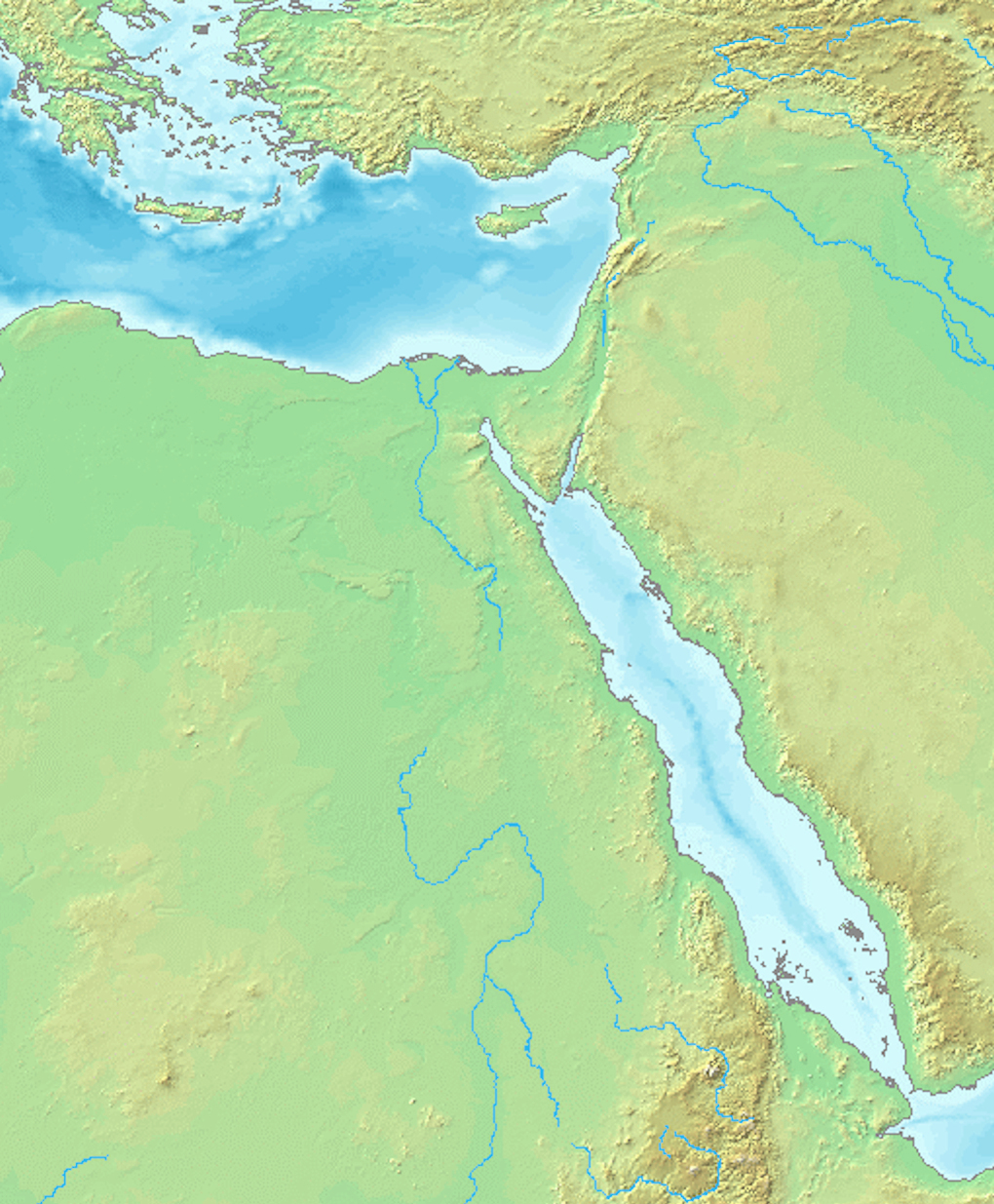
- Early Dynastic Period of Egypt (Egypt) Early Dynastic Period of Egypt (Northeast Africa)
- Capital: Thinis, then Memphis
- Common languages: Ancient Egyptian
- Religion: Egyptian religion
- Government: Monarchy
- Pharaoh
  - c. 3150 BC: Narmer (first)
  - c. 2690 BC: Khasekhemwy (last)
- History
  - Began: c. 3150 BC
  - Ended: c. 2686 BC
Preceded by	Succeeded by
Predynastic Egypt; Dynasty 0	Old Kingdom of Egypt

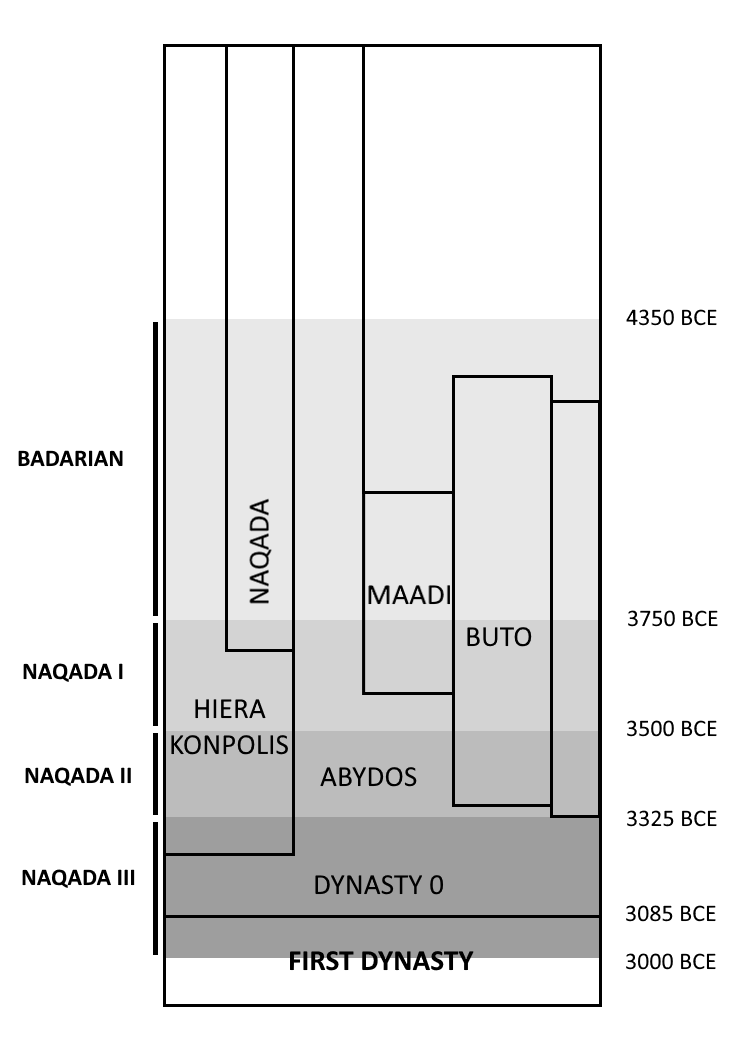
Chronology of state formation in Ancient Egypt.

The Early Dynastic Period, also known as Archaic Period or the Thinite Period (from Thinis, the hometown of its rulers), is the era of ancient Egypt that immediately follows the unification of Upper and Lower Egypt in c. 3150 BC. It is generally taken to include the First Dynasty and the Second Dynasty, lasting from the end of the archaeological culture of Naqada III until c. 2686 BC, or the beginning of the Old Kingdom. With the First Dynasty, the Egyptian capital moved from Thinis to Memphis, with the unified land being ruled by an Egyptian god-king. In the south, Abydos remained the major centre of ancient Egyptian religion; the hallmarks of ancient Egyptian civilization, such as Egyptian art, Egyptian architecture, and many aspects of Egyptian religion, took shape during the Early Dynastic Period.

Before the unification of Egypt, the land was settled with autonomous villages. With the early dynasties, and for much of Egypt's history thereafter, the country came to be known as "The Two Lands" (referencing Upper and Lower Egypt). The pharaohs established a national administration and appointed royal governors, and buildings of the central government were typically open-air temples constructed of wood or sandstone. The earliest Egyptian hieroglyphs appear just before this period, though little is known of the spoken language that they represent.

== Cultural evolution ==
N16 N16
tȝwy 'Two Lands'
in hieroglyphs

By about 3600 BC, Neolithic Egyptian societies along the Nile had based their culture on the raising of crops and the domestication of animals. Shortly after 3600 BC, Egyptian society began to grow and advance rapidly toward refined civilization. New and discrete pottery styles related to those of Palestine appeared and copper became more extensively used. The Mesopotamian process of sun-dried bricks, and architectural building principles—including the use of the arch and recessed walls for decorative effect—became popular.

Concurrent with these cultural advances, a process of unification of the societies and towns of the upper Nile River, or Upper Egypt, occurred. At the same time, the societies of the Nile Delta, or Lower Egypt also underwent a unification process. Warfare between Upper and Lower Egypt occurred often. During his reign in Upper Egypt, King Narmer defeated his enemies on the Delta and merged both the Kingdom of Upper and Lower Egypt under his single rule. Narmer is shown on palettes wearing the double crown, composed of the lotus flower representing Upper Egypt and the papyrus reed representing Lower Egypt - a sign of the unified rule of both parts of Egypt which was followed by all succeeding rulers. In mythology, the unification of Egypt is portrayed as the falcon-god, called Horus and identified with Lower Egypt, as conquering and subduing the god Set, who was identified with Upper Egypt. Divine kingship, which would persist in Egypt for the next three millennia, was firmly established as the basis of Egypt's government. The unification of societies along the Nile has also been linked to the end of the African humid period.

Funeral practices for non-elites would have been the same as in predynastic times, but the rich demanded more elaborate rituals. Thus, the Egyptians began construction of the mastabas which became models for the later Old Kingdom constructions such as the step pyramid. Cereal agriculture and centralization contributed to the success of the state for the next 800 years.

It seems certain that Egypt became unified as a cultural and economic domain long before its first king ascended to the throne in the lower Egyptian city of Memphis. Political unification proceeded gradually, perhaps over a period of a few centuries, as local districts established trading networks and as the ability of their governments to organize agriculture labor on a larger scale increased. Divine kingship may also have gained spiritual momentum as the cults of gods like Horus, Set and Neith associated with living representatives became widespread in the country.

=== Writing system ===
It was also during this period that the Egyptian writing system was further developed. Initially, Egyptian writing had been composed primarily of a few symbols denoting amounts of various substances. The Second Dynasty of Egypt sees the advent of the first known complete sentences in Egyptian hieroglyphs. Probably the first known such sentence is a seal impression from Peribsen's tomb, at the end of the Second Dynasty, dating to ca. 2660–2650 BC. The sentence relates to the unification of Egypt: "Sealing of everything of Ombos (i.e., Naqada): He of Ombos has joined the Two Lands for his son, the Dual King Peribsen." By the end of the 3rd dynasty it had been expanded to include more than 200 symbols, both phonograms and ideograms. In all likelihood, Naqada III saw the earliest codification of signs, where royal serekhs—a rectangular cartouche representing the niched or gated façade of a palace surmounted by the Horus falcon—are also first seen, painted on jars and impressed on their sealings. These goods were often traded "abroad through the northern Sinai to southern Palestine."

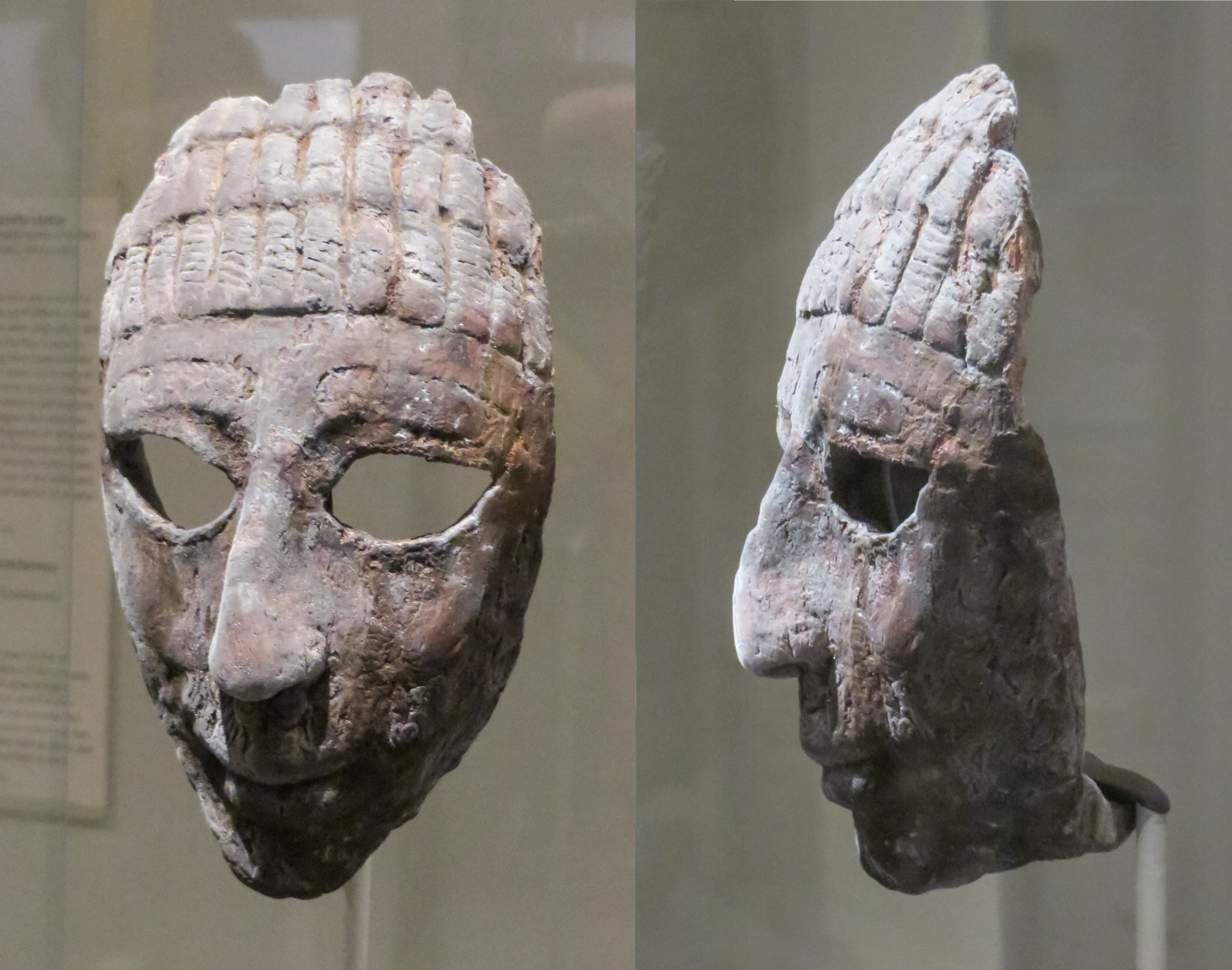
Depiction of king Den (2873-2859 BC).

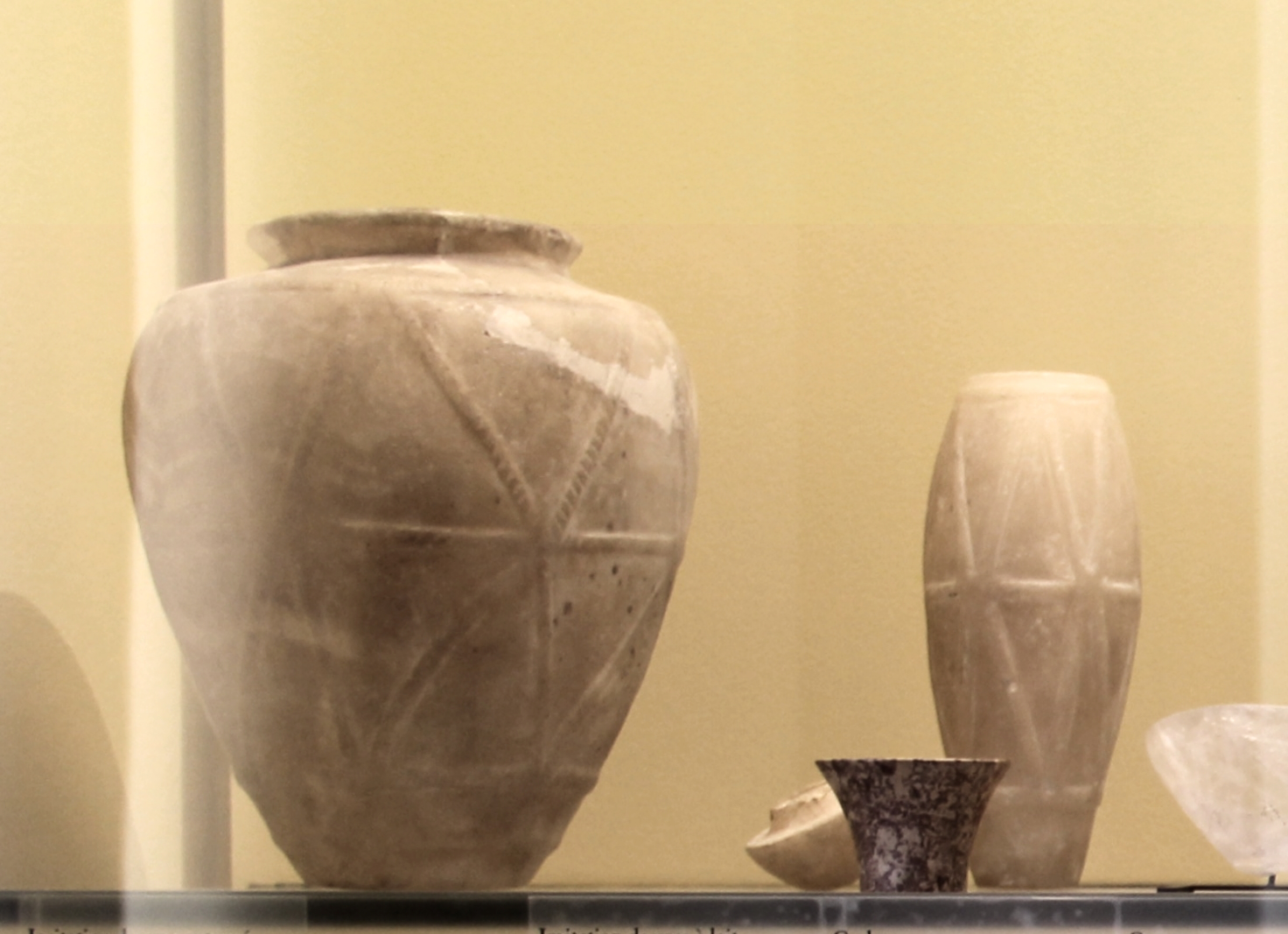
Alabaster vessels from a 1st Dynasty cemetery, Abu Roach. Louvre Museum AF 9149, AF 9148

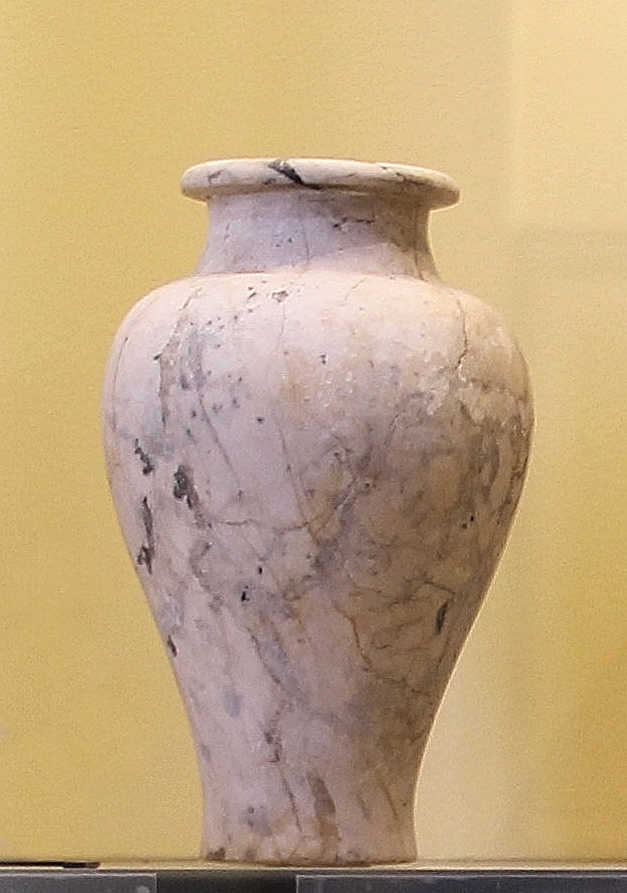
Marble vase from the tomb of Khasekhemwy, Second Dynasty. Abydos, circa 2700 BC. Louvre Museum, E 23051

== First Pharaoh ==
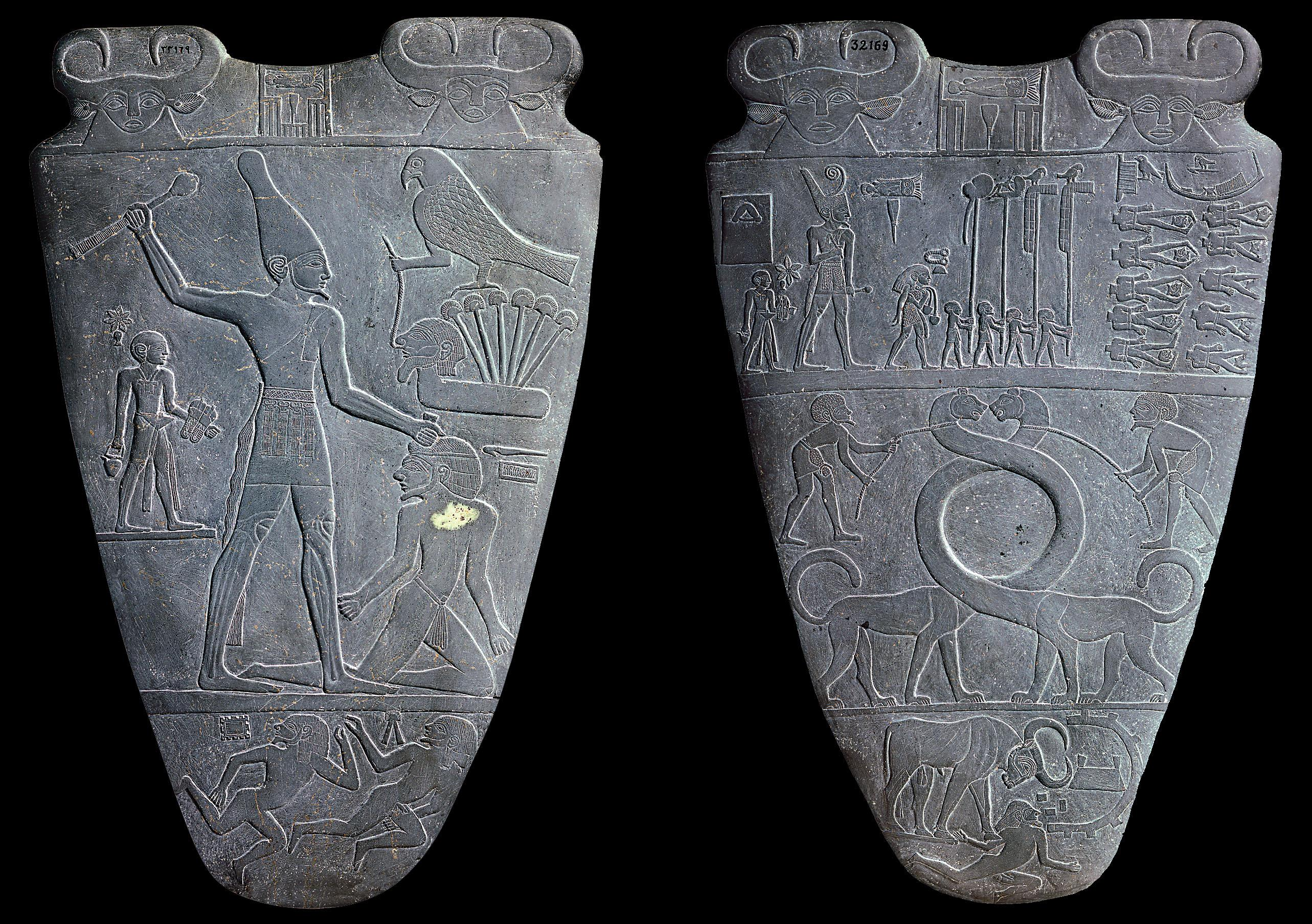
The Narmer Palette depicts the unification of the Two Lands.

According to Manetho, the first monarch of the unified Upper and Lower Egypt was Menes, who is now identified with Narmer, the earliest recorded First Dynasty monarch. Narmer appears first on the necropolis seal impressions of Den and Qa'a. This shows that Narmer was recognized by the first dynasty kings as an important founding figure. Narmer is also the earliest king associated to the symbols of power over the two lands (see in particular the Narmer Palette, a votive cosmetic palette showing Narmer wearing the crowns of Upper and Lower Egypt) and may therefore be the first king to achieve the unification. Consequently, the current consensus is that "Menes" and "Narmer" refer to the same person. Alternative theories hold that Narmer was the final king of the Naqada III period and Hor-Aha is to be identified with "Menes".

== Egyptians in Canaan and Nubia ==
Early Dynastic Egypt, with contemporary cultures c. 3000 BC

Egyptian settlement and colonization are attested from about 3200 BC onward all over the area of southern Canaan with almost every type of artifact: architecture (fortifications, embankments and buildings), pottery, vessels, tools, weapons, seals, etc. 20 serekhs attributed to Narmer—the first ruler of the Early Dynastic Period—have been found in Canaan. The Egyptian colonial domain in the region was likely administered from Tell es-Sakan, a fortified settlement inhabited from 3300 to 3000 BC.

There is also evidence of Egyptian settlement and occupation in lower Nubia after the Nubian A-Group culture came to an end. By the Early Dynastic Period, the Egyptian state had likely imposed its authority as far north as modern Tel Aviv and as far south as the second cataract in Nubia.

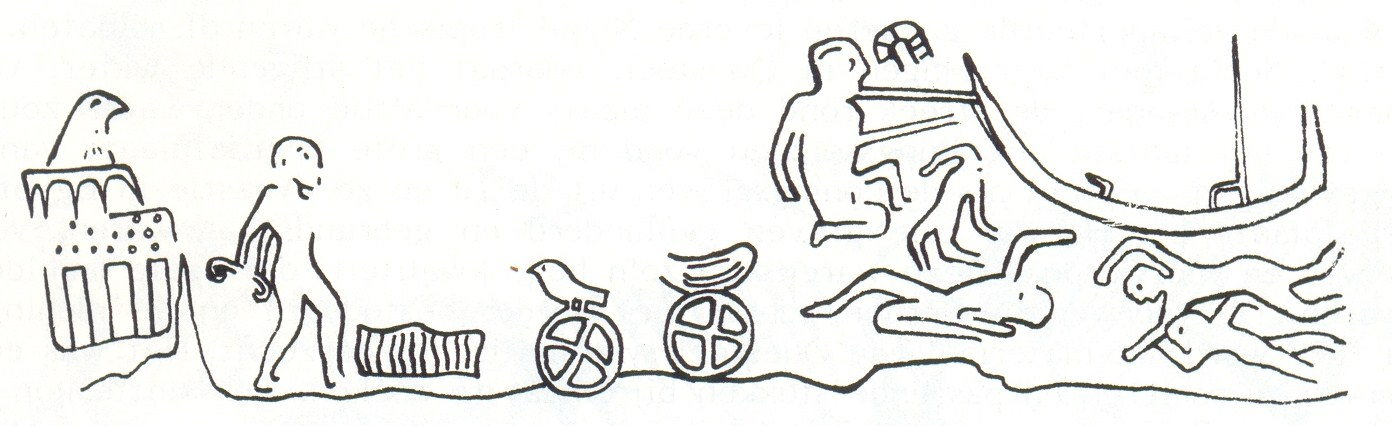
The Relief of Gebel Sheikh Suleiman probably shows the victory of a late pre-dynastic / early dynastic Egyptian king over A-Group Nubians.

Artifacts of the First Dynasty contain numerous depictions of captured foreigners, possibly alluding to the campaign to conquer Lower Egypt and the Nile Delta, and the accomplishment of the unification of Upper and Lower Egypt. Various ethnic types seems to be represented: Asiatic-looking foreigners with full beards and straight hair, possibly alluding to vanquished people from the eastern parts of the Nile delta, or naked individuals with curly hair, possibly Libyan tribes from the western Nile delta. Depiction of West-Asiatic-looking foreigners were found in the tomb of Pharaoh Qa'a, and the Narmer Palette also exhibits similar scenes of conquest over alien people.

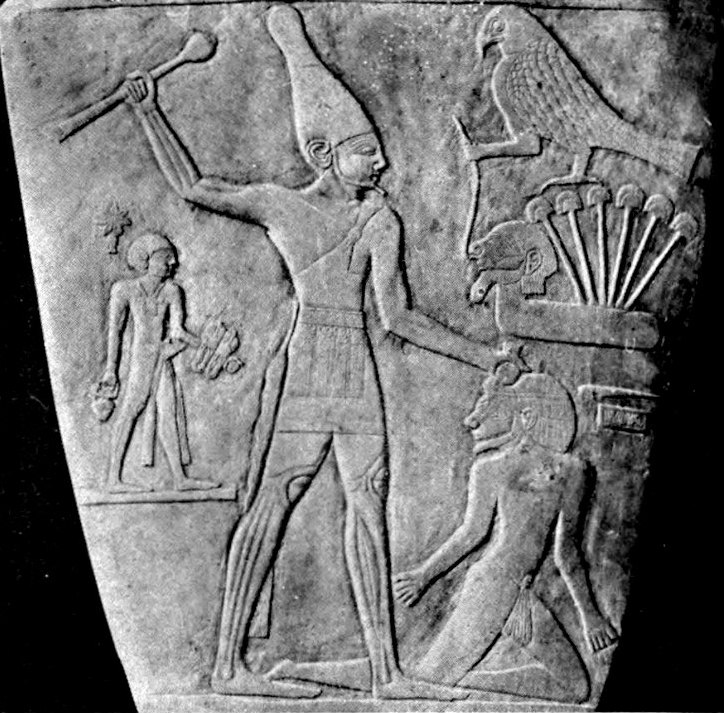
The Narmer Palette, Pharaoh Narmer subduing an enemy

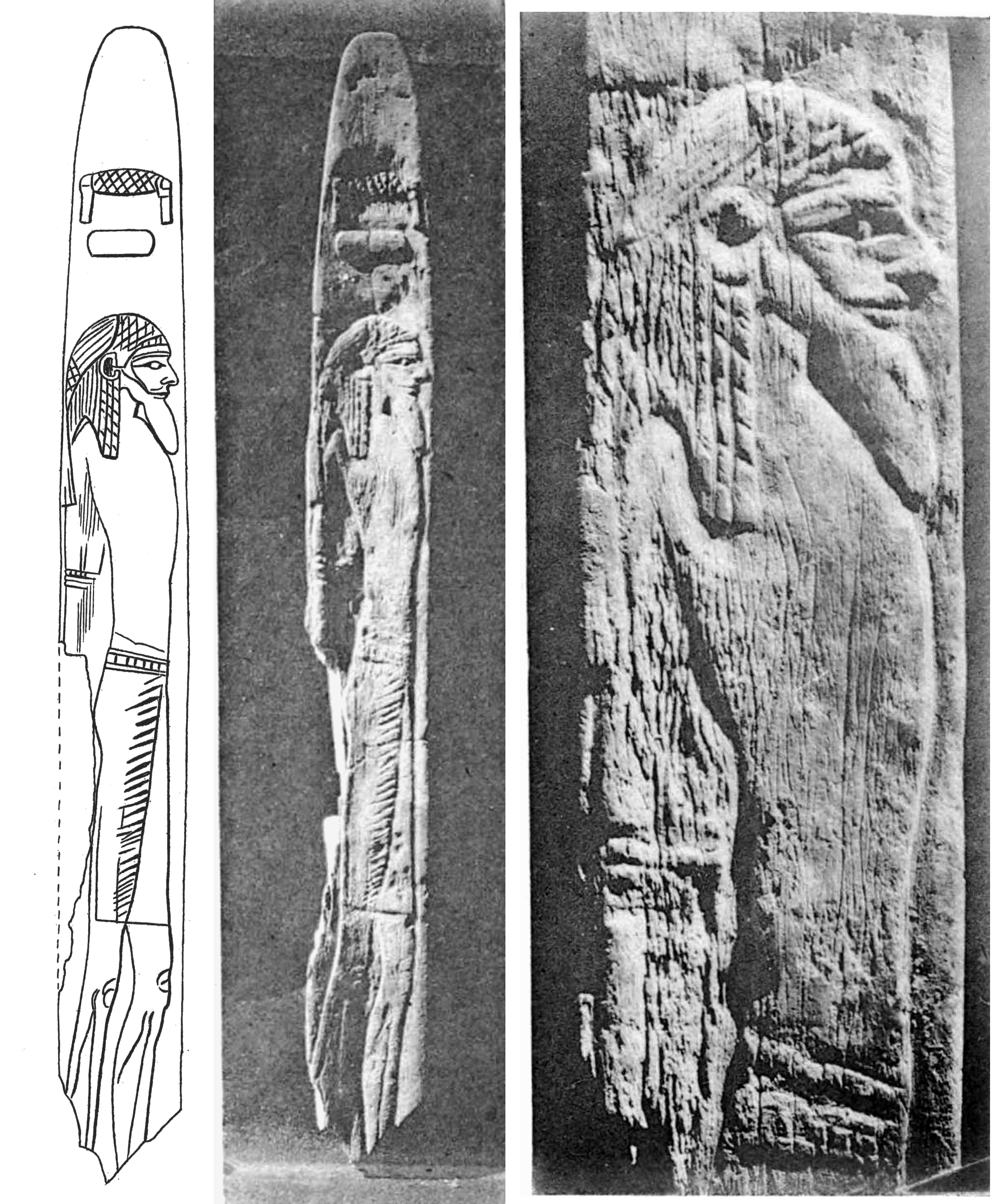
Asiatic prisoner. Abydos ivory tablet from the tomb of King Qa'a (ca. 2910 BC).

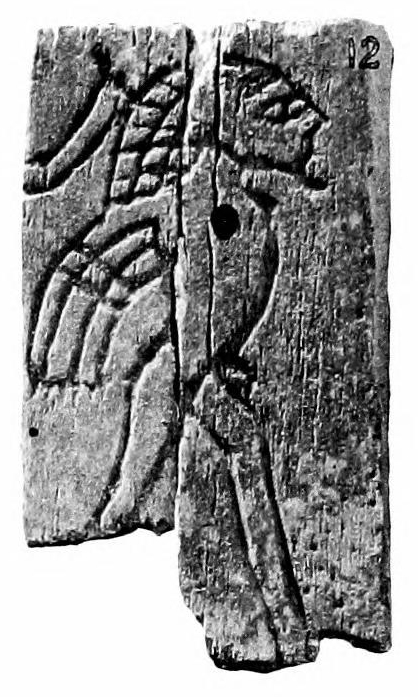
Naked captive with feather in the hair. First dynasty of Egypt, Tomb of Menes B17, Abydos.

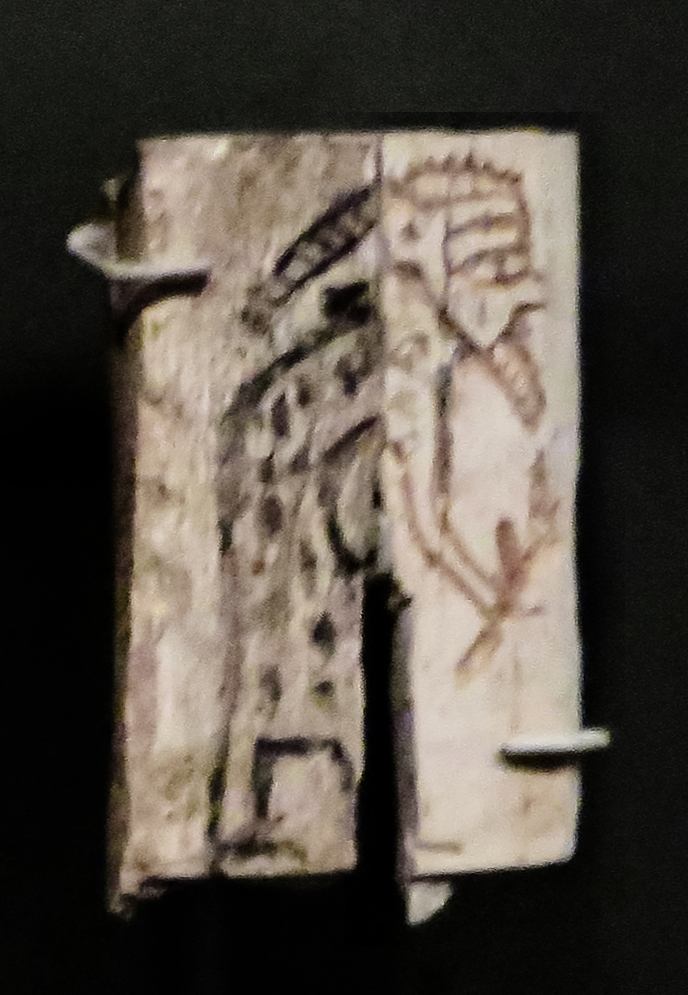
Vassal subject with headdress and spotted robe, possibly a Libyan, paying homage. First Dynasty, 2960–2770, Tomb of Menes B17, Abydos.

== Sources ==
- Charron, Alain (1990), "L'époque thinite", L'Égypte des millénaires obscures, Paris, pp. 77–97.
- Robins, Gay (2008). The Art of Ancient Egypt (revised ed.). Harvard University Press. ISBN 978-0-674-03065-7.
- Reid, Donald Malcolm (2003). Whose Pharaohs? Archaeology, Museums, and Egyptian National Identity from Napoleon to World War I. University of California Press. ISBN 9780520240698.
- Stevenson, Alice (2015). The Petrie Museum of Egyptian Archaeology: Characters and Collections. London: UCLPress. ISBN 978-1-910634-04-2.

Open access pdf download.

- Trope, Betsy Teasley; Quirke, Stephen; Lacovara, Peter (2005), Excavating Egypt: great discoveries from the Petrie Museum of Egyptian Archaeology, University College, London, Atlanta: Michael C. Carlos Museum, Emory University.
- Wilkinson, TAH (1999), Early Dynastic Egypt, London; New York: Routledge.
