= Hor B =

Predynastic pharaoh of Egypt

Hor "B"

Pharaoh

Hor-B, Hor B, B, or B Hor is the provisional name of a pharaoh who probably ruled in Dynasty 0 whose existence is disputed. His name has been found in the Nile Valley. These serekhs likely date to the end of the fourth millennium BCE.

== Attestations ==
B's serekh has been found in two places:

- Two serekhs bearing the Horus falcon were discovered in site 34 at Winkler, west of Armant.
- a third serekh, this time without a falcon and whose attribution to the same king is uncertain, was discovered at site 5 of Winkler on the desert road leading from Qena to Al-Qusair (along the Red Sea coast).

== Identification ==
Based on the early dating and the location of the inscriptions, Toby Wilkinson proposes identifying this serekh as belonging to a potential king of the proto-kingdom of Nekhen during the Predynastic period.

For his part, Caleb R. Hamilton proposes identifying him with King Ka of the late Predynastic period. He bases this on the fact that several kings of that period and of the First Dynasty used different spellings for their respective serekhs (such as Djer in the rock inscription at Gebel Sheikh Suleiman and Qa'a in the Kharga Oasis).

== Bibliography ==
- Hamilton, Caleb R. (2020). Warfe, A.R.; Gill, J.C.R.; Hamilton, C.R.; Pettman, A.J.; Stewart, D.A. (eds.). "An Early Egyptian King in the Western Desert Margin Dust". Dust, Demons and Pots: Studies in Honour of Colin A. Hope, Orientalia Lovaniensia Analecta. Peeters Publishers: 227–240.
- Caleb R. Hamilton, « An Early Egyptian King in the Western Desert Margin », dans A.R. Warfe, J.C.R. Gill, C.R. Hamilton, A.J. Pettman, D.A. Stewart, Dust, Demons and Pots. Studies in Honour of Colin A. Hope, Louvain, Peeters Publishers Leuven, coll. « Orientalia Lovaniensia Analecta » (no 289), 2020 (ISBN 978-90-429-4136-6, PDF en ligne) ;
- Stan Hendrickx, H. Riemer, F. Förster et J.C. Darnell, « Late Predynastic/Early Dynastic rock art scenes of Barbary sheep hunting in Egypt’s Western Desert: from capturing wild animals to the women of the "Acacia House" », dans H. Riemer, F. Förster, M. Herb and N. Pöllath, Desert Animals in the Eastern Sahara: Status, Economic Significance, and Cultural Reflection in Antiquity. Proceedings of an Interdisciplinary ACACIA Workshop held at the University of Cologne December 14-15, 2007, Cologne, Heinrich-Bath-Institut, 2009, p. 189-244 ;
- Somaglino, Claire; Tallet, Pierre (2014). "Une campagne en Nubie sous la Ire : la scène nagadienne du Gebel Sheikh Suleiman comme prototype et modèle". Nehet, revue numérique d’égyptologie (in French). Paris-Sorbonne, Université Libre de Bruxelles. ;
- Wilkinson, Toby (1999). Early dynastic Egypt. Londres, New-York: Routledge. p. 436. ISBN 978-0415186339. ;
- Winkler, Hans A. (1938). Rock-drawings of Southern Upper Egypt (PDF). London: Egypt Exploration Society..
