= Double Falcon =

Ruler of Lower Egypt from Naqada III during the 32nd century BCE

- Dju?, Nebwy?, Horwy?, Hrwy?
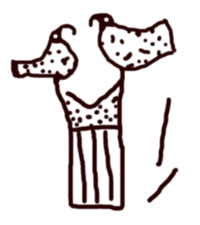
- Serekh of Double Falcon. Redrawing of an inscription on a vessel found in el-Beda.

Pharaoh
- Reign: 32nd century BC
- Predecessor: Scorpion I?
- Successor: Iry-Hor?
Royal titulary
Horus name
ḏw?
nb.wy?
G5 G5	N26
- Dynasty: Naqada III

Double Falcon (also possibly Dju, Nebwy, Hrwy, and Horwy) was a ruler of Lower Egypt from Naqada III. He may have reigned during the 32nd century BC. The length of his reign is unknown.

== Attestation ==
In 1910, Egyptologist Jean Clédat discovered the first evidence of Double Falcon's existence. Clédat was excavating the site of El Mahmoudiyah in the northeastern Nile Delta when a peasant brought him a jar and some incised fragments that he had uncovered during the planting of a palm-grove in nearby el-Beda. Investigating the site, Clédat soon discovered four serekhs of Double Falcon.

The next attestation of Double Falcon was discovered in 1912 during excavations by Hermann Junker on the site of Tura, where a tomb yielded a complete jar bearing a serekh topped by two falcons.

More recently, serekhs of Double Falcon have been found in the Sinai Peninsula, in Tell Ibrahim Awad in the eastern Delta, in Adaima and Abydos in Upper Egypt, and in the Palmahim quarry in southern Israel.

The concentration of Double Falcon's serekhs in Lower Egypt and the north-western Sinai indicates that his rule may have been limited to these regions. Nonetheless, the wider geographic presence of his serekhs, notably in Upper Egypt and the Southern Levant, suggests that the long-distance authority of the Naqada III kings had already commenced towards the end of the period, be it through trading or warfare.

If the inscriptions on the recto side of the Libyan Palette are indeed royal names, Double Falcon may be listed alongside either Scorpion I or Scorpion II in the second row of inscribed symbols.

== Name ==
The serekh of Double Falcon is unique in its layout and composition. Firstly, it is the only serekh topped by two Horus falcons, facing each other. Secondly, the serekh does not have a name compartment, being filled by the vertical lines which usually represent the niched facade of a palace. The serekh also lacks the horizontal line that delimits the palace facade from the name of the ruler above. Finally, each falcon stands on its own peak. So-called "anonymous serekhs" have been found somewhat frequently all over Upper and Lower Egypt, some even finding provenance in Rafah, located in southern Palestine. Many were discovered in the tombs of Abydos, namely in the tombs U-s and U-t. In addition to the original Double Falcon serekh, M. J. Clédat also found a number of other similarly styled serekhs from artifacts at el-Beda, one of which he postulated represented a name of a queen, "Ka-Neith". As for Double Falcon, a pharaoh, Clédat and fellow Egyptologists Günter Dreyer and Edwin van den Brink suspect that a deeper symbolism explains these peculiarities. The two falcons could represent Lower Egypt and the Sinai, as it seems that Double Falcon reigned over both regions. Dreyer believes that the falcons stand on a representation of the "mountain sign", N26 of Gardiner's sign list:

N26

and reads the name as Dju (ḏw), so that the name of the king is represented by a pair of falcons on mountains above a plain serekh. In contrast, Alejandro Jiménez Serrano reads the name as Nebwy (nb.wy), "the two lords", and sees a similarity with a much earlier cosmetic palette on display in the Barbier-Mueller Museum of Geneva.

== See also ==
- List of pharaohs
