= Ny-Hor =

Egyptian ruler

- Ni-Hor
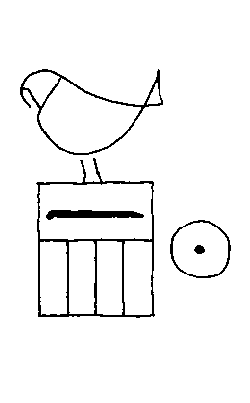
- Serekh of Ny-Hor

Pharaoh
- Reign: c. 3200 BC
- Predecessor: Hedju Hor?
- Successor: Hat-Hor?
Royal titulary
Horus name
Ḥr-nw
G5	n	ra
- Dynasty: Predynastic Period

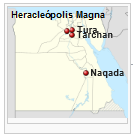
Map of locations for Pharaoh Ny-hor

Ny-Hor (fl. c. 3200 BC) was a possible pharaoh from the Predynastic Period. His name means "The Hunter" according to egyptologist Werner Kaiser. He may have ruled during the 31st century BC.

== Name ==
Although the interpretation is controversial, it is believed that his Horus name is, "Ḥr-nj / Ḥr-nw" which means, "He belongs to Horus / Hunter of Horus".

However, unlike later pharaohs, his serekh name does not include a Horus falcon. The exact reason for this is unknown, but it may be because he predates this practice, or that he was not considered a king, as was later understood. Variant names include: Ni-Hor, Hor-ni, or Ny-Hor.

== Evidence ==
Ny-Hor's name appears predominantly on clay and stone vessels found in tombs near Tarkhan, Tura, Tarjan and Naqada. Evidence of his rule is very poor and its existence is doubted by some of the research, and opinion about the actual reading and interpretation of the name are divided.

- Some Egyptologists believe that Ny-Hor is an alternative naming for the Pharaoh Narmer.
- William Matthew Flinders Petrie was undecided due to the improperly executed representation of the character assigned this king and was unwilling to ascribe him as Pharaoh Narmer.
- Thomas Schneider, Günter Dreyer, and Werner Kaiser, on the other hand, consider that Ny-Hor was not Narmer as bones found in the graves of Tarkhan predate the time in which Narmer lived.
- Egyptologist Ludwig D. Morenz, on the other hand, warns against specifying any concrete option, since the evidence is too tenuous at this time.

== Biography ==
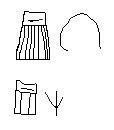
Serekhs of Ny-Hor

Very little is known of his rule, and his existence remains controversial.

Horus Ny (Ny-Hor) was a (possible) ruler of Lower Egypt during the Pre-Dynastic era who lived, according to tradition, and reigned around 3200–3175 BC. Inscriptions of his name come from Tarkhan, Tura, and Naqada.

It is assumed that he would have been from a rival dynasty to that of the rulers of Thinis, 150 years before those kings conquered his lands and established Dynasty I.
