= Relief of Gebel Sheikh Suleiman =

Ancient Egyptian artefact

Relief of Jebel Sheikh Suleiman

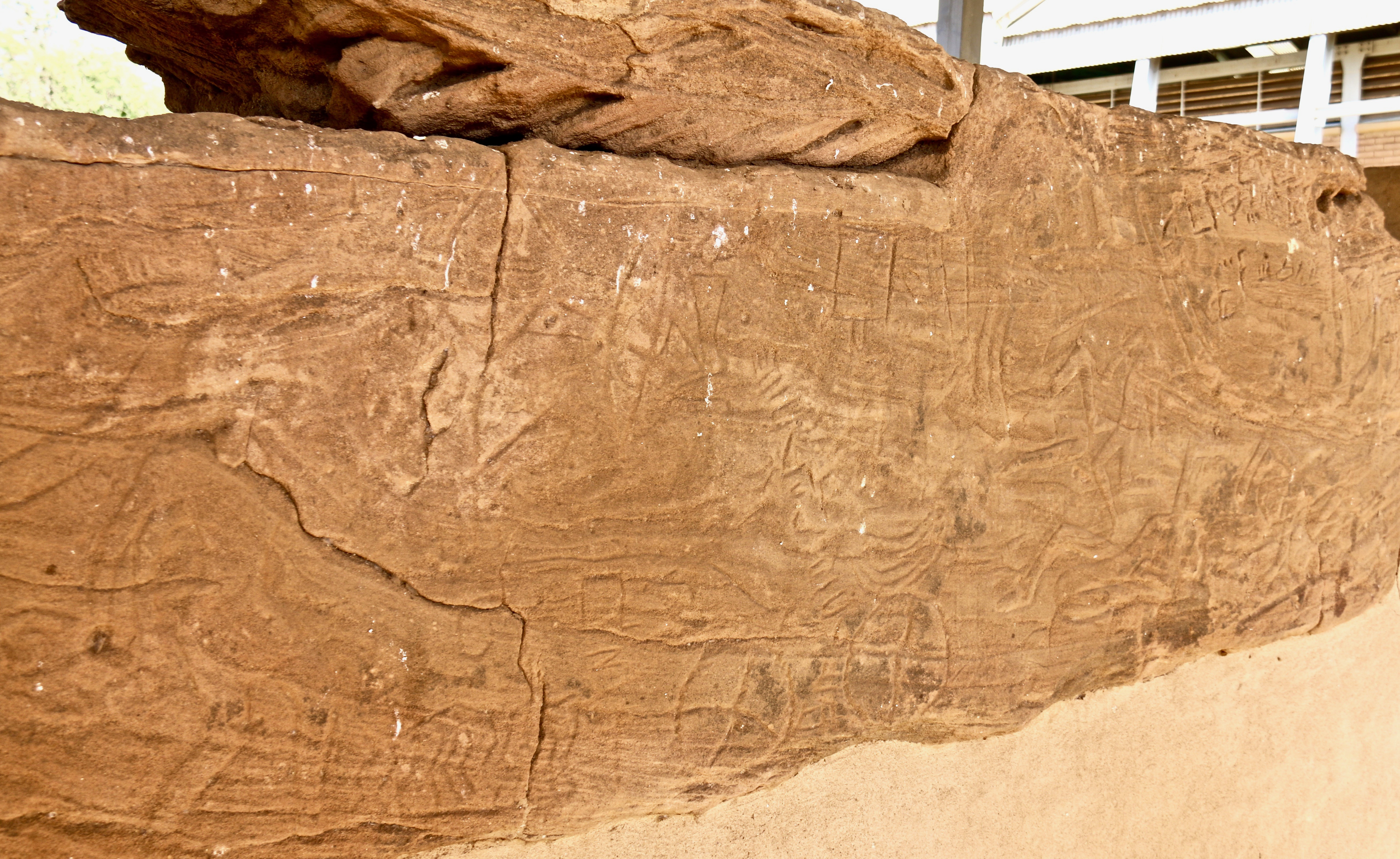
The relief in the National Museum of Sudan

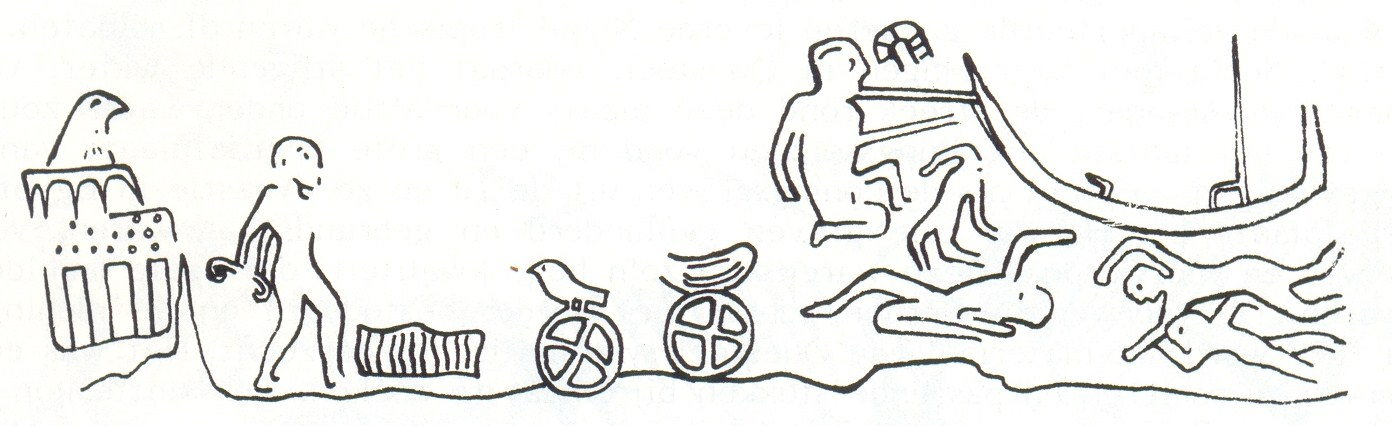
Drawing of the relief

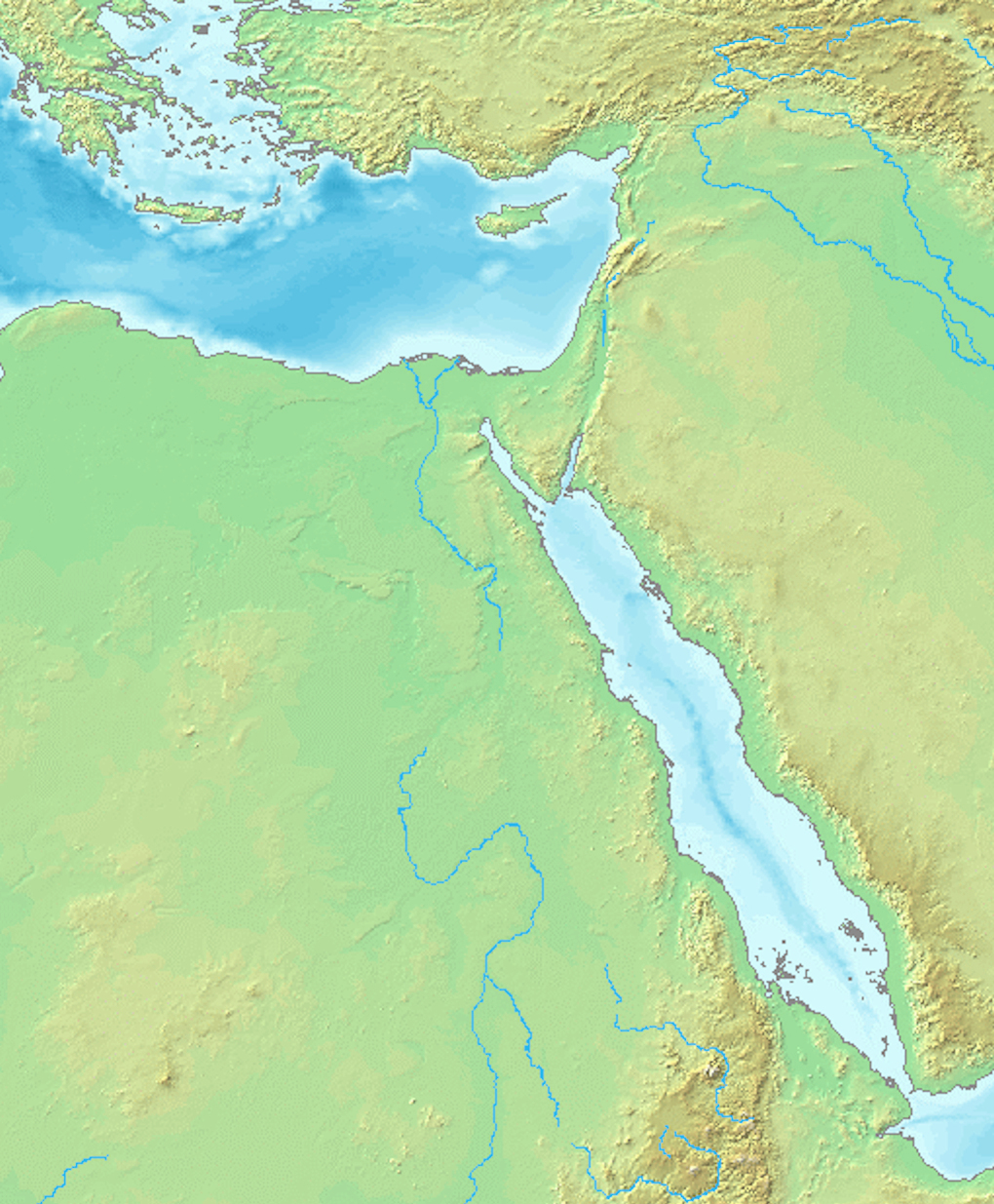
Location of Gebel Sheikh Suleiman.
Gebel Sheikh Suleiman (Sudan)

The relief of Gebel Sheikh Suleiman, or Jebel Sheikh Suleiman, is an ancient Egyptian relief generally dated to the late predynastic period of Egypt (Naqada III), or at the time of the first pharaohs circa 3000 BCE. More precisely, it has been proposed that it dates to pharaoh Djer or Djet, who was the third king of the First Dynasty, and who is known for his victorious expeditions to Nubia.

The relief comes from the Second Cataract, one of the most ancient frontiers in the history of mankind, in an area just south of Buhen. It is now kept in the National Museum of Sudan. The relief was transferred to the National Museum of Sudan in Khartoum in 1963, before the drowning of the area by the water of the Lake Nasser.

Inscribed on a large block of sandstone (2,75m x 0,80m), it is an early example of low relief carving, possibly describing a war between the Egyptians and the A-Group Nubian people. It describes the victory of an Egyptian king, embodied by his serekh, although the serekh does not give a specific royal name. The circles at the bottom represent cities. The boat is considered as an embodiment of the king, dominating defeated Nubians.

The iconography is comparable to that of the earlier Gebel el-Arak Knife or the fresco from Tomb 100 at Hierakonpolis, all corresponding to the Naqada II period of Prehistoric Egypt, and might be considered as a slight archaism meant to legitimize the rule of the early pharaoh who authored the relief. The symbolism and early hieroglyphic markings do point to the First Dynasty or Second Dynasty of Egypt.

A second inscription found nearby represents a large scorpion with bound captives, and seems to be from an slightly earlier date, and possibly related to king Scorpion II.

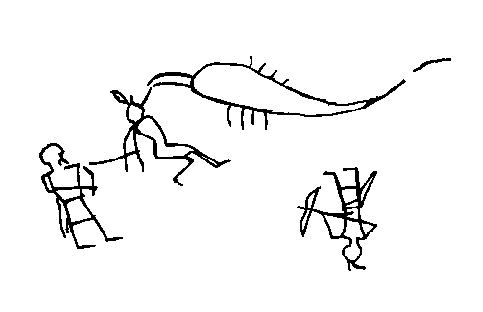
The "Scorpion relief".
