= Horus name =

Oldest known crest of ancient Egyptian rulers

Horus name (Serekh name) in hieroglyphs
O33
srḫ
serekh
facade (of the palace)
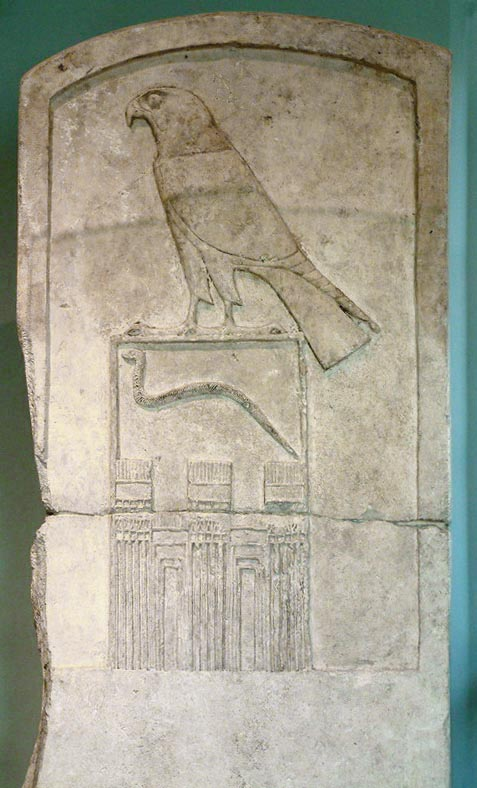
- Serekh of king Djet with the Horus falcon above

- Serekh of king Peribsen with the image of Set, the god of the desert, and a sun disc above

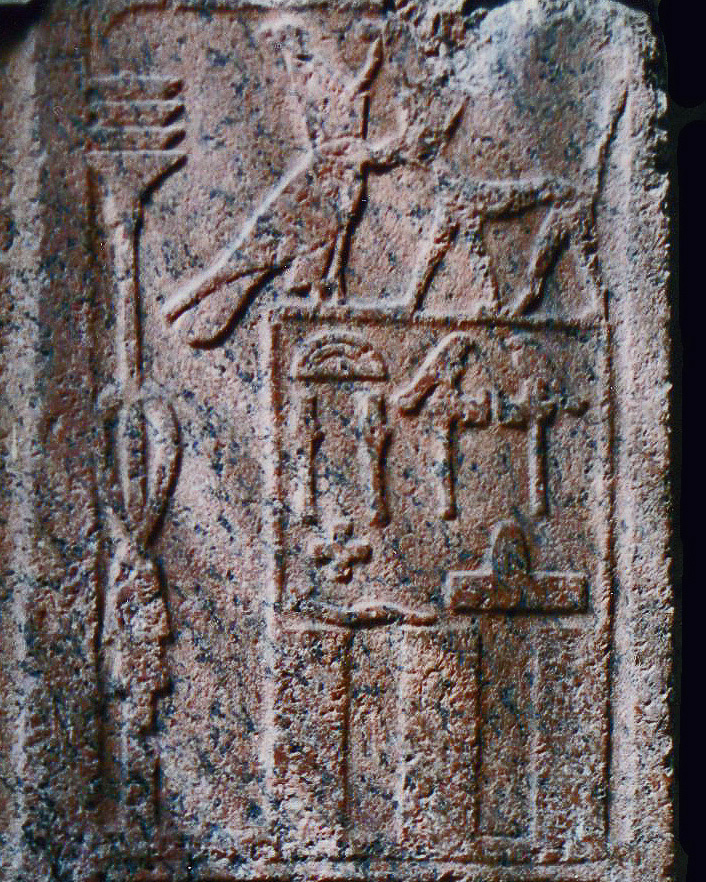
- Serekh of king Khasekhemwy with both Horus and Set above

The Horus name is the oldest known and used crest of ancient Egyptian rulers. It belongs to the "great five names" of an Egyptian pharaoh. However, modern Egyptologists and linguists are starting to prefer the more neutral term "serekh name". This is because not every pharaoh placed the falcon, which symbolizes the deity Horus, atop his (or in some cases, her) serekh. It changed its meaning during the Ptolemaic period, when it was still used by pharaohs, but was also adopted by some of queens consorts.

== Heraldic appearance ==
The picture of the Horus name is made of two basic elements: A sitting or walking figure of a certain deity holds a rectangular, ornamental vignette, imitating the floor plan of a palace facade and the royal courtyard. The rectangular vignette is called serekh, after the Egyptian word for "facade". There are countless variations of the facade decor in the serekh. The complexity and detail of the facade decor varied remarkably depending on the object on which it was present. It seems that no strict artistic rules for the design of the serekh itself existed. The name of the ruler was written inside the free space that represents the royal courtyard.

== Symbology ==
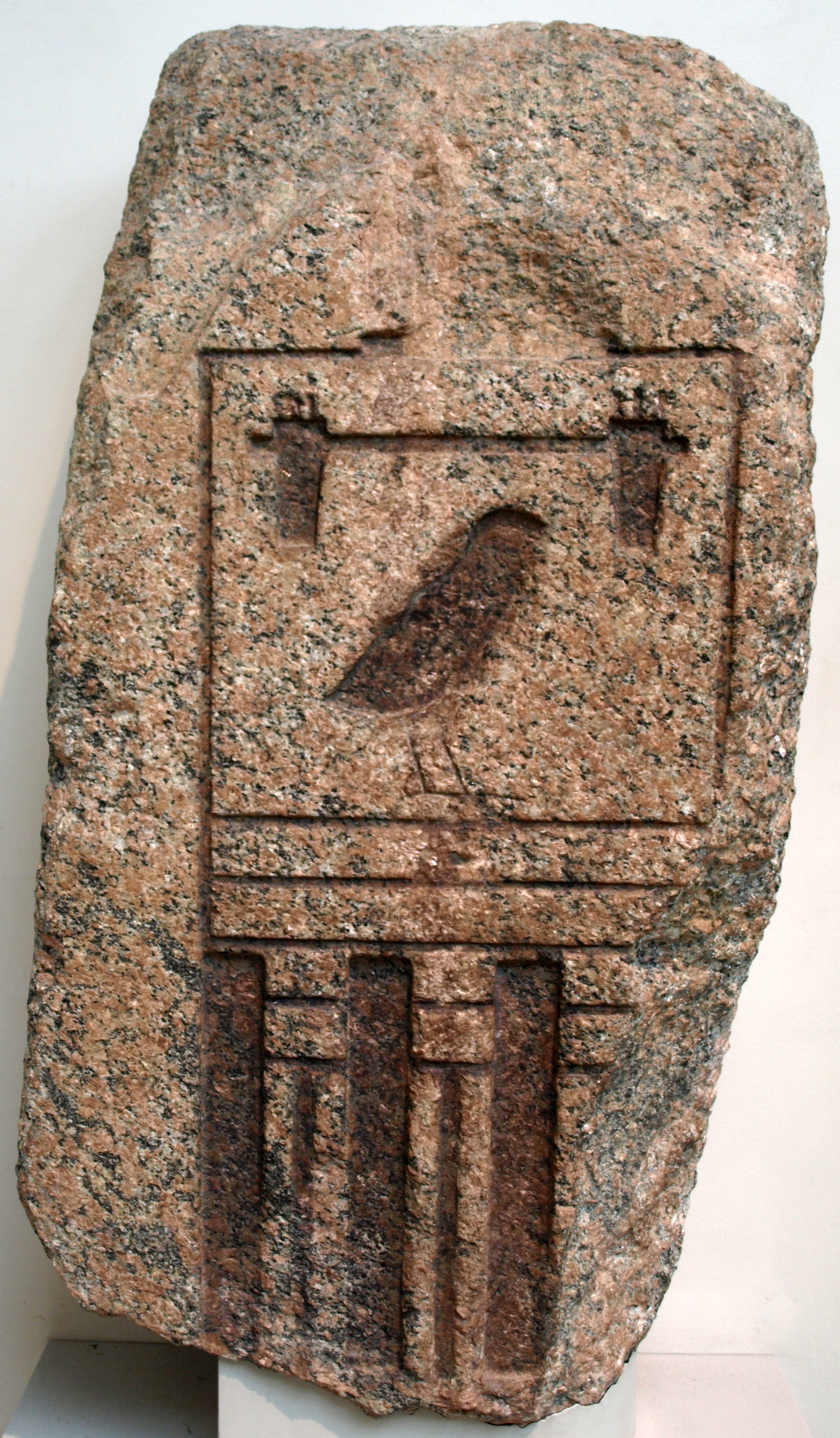
A granite fragment with Khufu's horus name Medjedu on it.

The symbolic meaning of the Horus name is still disputed. It seems obvious, at least, that the name of a king was addressed straight to the deity on top of the serekh. In most cases it was the falcon of the god Horus. This is based on the Egyptian tradition and belief that a living king was commonly the herald and earthly representative of Horus. A good example is the name of 2nd Dynasty king Raneb. His name was written with the sign of the sun (Râ) and the sign of a basket (néb). Altogether, the name reads "Lord of the sun of Horus", thus integrating Horus as the royal patron into the king's name. Scholars point to the symbolic and expressive strength of the Horus falcon: hovering high in the sky, stretching out his wings widely and seemingly looking over all of Egypt, this heraldic animal represented omnipresence and an outstretching power. Additionally, the names of early dynasty kings show, when translated, an astonishing aggressiveness, which clearly expresses the wish of Egyptian kings to be untouchable and unbeatable, thanks to the god Horus. During the 2nd Dynasty, the serekh names of the kings reveal a rather peace-seeking nature, expressing the wish of the pharaohs to rule over an unwavering world full of order and harmony: the epitheton of the Horus name of King Sekhemib, Per-en-ma'at (meaning "he who achieves Ma'at"), is the clearest early expression of this. As already mentioned, most Egyptian kings favored Horus as their dynastic name patron.

In a few cases, especially during the midst of the 2nd Dynasty, at least two serekh names seem to contradict the Horus tradition. The most prominent example is king Seth-Peribsen. He first replaced the falcon figure of his serekh by the walking animal of the god Seth. Then, his name was written in a plural form, thus being addressed to Seth as well as to Horus. The serekh names of his followers Sekhemib and Khasekhemwy were similarly built. Khasekhemwy went even further and placed both divine figures of Horus and Seth above his serekh, in an attempt to accentuate the dualism of a serekh name. The remarkable behaviour of the 2nd Dynasty kings can possibly be explained by the Egyptian belief that a king represented Horus and Seth in the same ways. Maybe said kings simply wished to express this dualism by willingly changing the appearance of the serekh and replacing divine figures on its top.

== Introduction and history ==
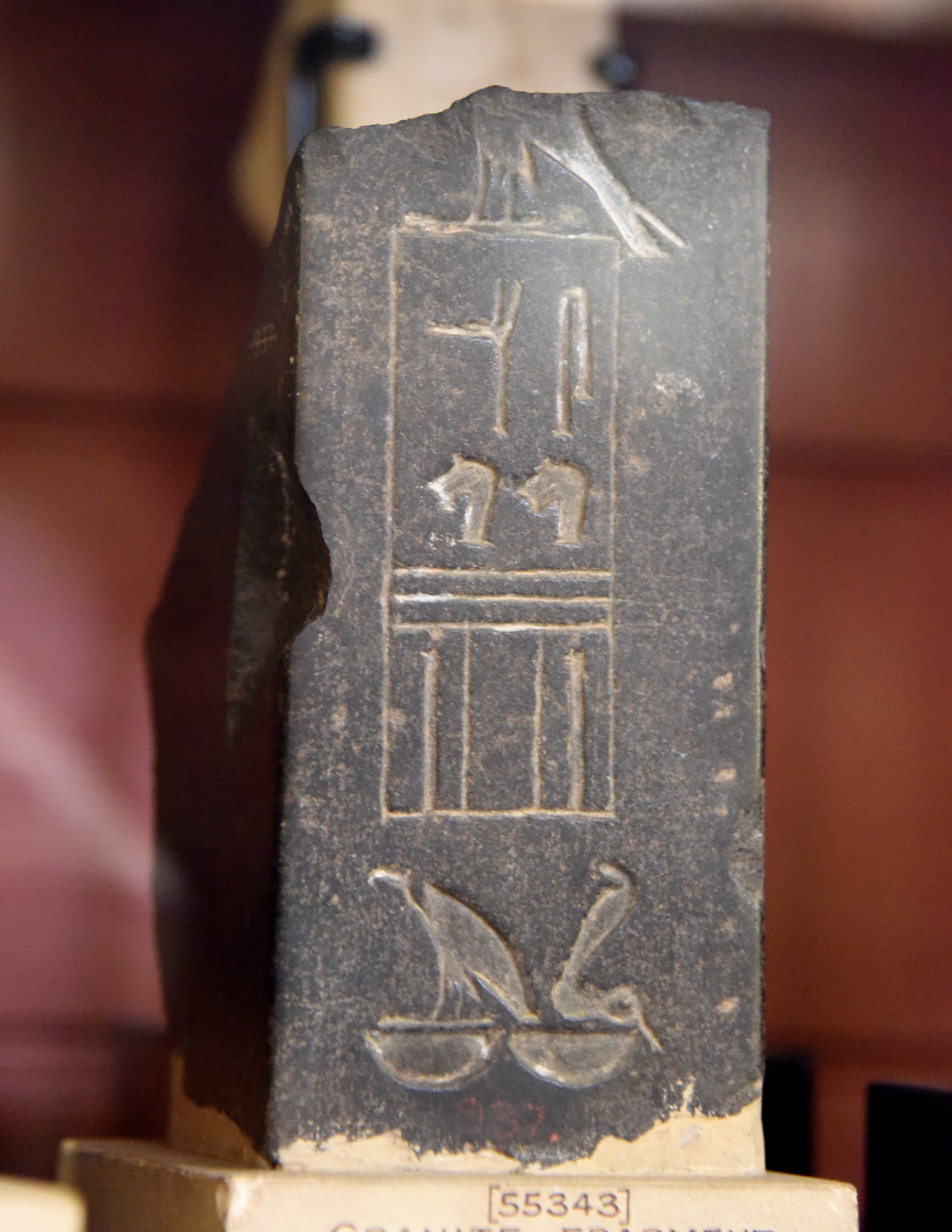
Horus name of Shoshenq V, Userpehty, incised above Nekhbet and Wadjet. Fragment of a plinth, black basalt. From Fayum, Egypt. 22nd Dynasty. The British Museum, London

As already mentioned, the Horus name is the oldest known and used royal title. Its introduction reaches back to the time of the Naqada II period at 3400 BC, and its development can be observed on objects from Naqada II to the 1st Dynasty. However, at the time of introduction, the serekhs of kings were yet anonymous. Later the name of the king was written beside the serekh or omitted completely. In many cases the serekh lacks the Horus falcon, and in other cases, such as the serekh of king Ka, the serekh seems to be held by Horus upside-down. During the middle and late Naqada III period (3200–3030 BC.), kings started to write their name inside their serekhs. Some of the best-known early examples are the names of Scorpion II and Ka. Under these kings, the serekh was introduced in its final form. During the 1st Dynasty, an odd fashion can be observed: On several clay seals from the Abydene tombs of king Hor-Aha, Qa'a and queen Meritneith, the Horus names of all archaeologically detected kings from Narmer to Qa'a are listed in one single and smooth row. All of these Horus names are missing a serekh. The exact reason for this is unknown, but it demonstrates complexity within the tradition of royal titulary, which is not fully understood even today.

== Special serekhs ==
During the introduction and development of the serekh names, two examples of special serekhs are of very special interest to Egyptologists and historians.

The first example is the serekh of a protodynastic king known as "Double Falcon". The serekh of this particular king has a top that is sharply bent inwards at the very middle. The inside of the serekh is filled with a great many little dots. This makes the upper part of the serekh look like the hieroglyphic sign of a two-topped mountain, the sign for "desert" or "foreign land". A further curiosity of Double Falcon's serekh are the two falcon figures, each one resting on one corner atop the bent serekh and facing each other. Egyptologists and historians are convinced that this unusual king's name has a deeper meaning. Most possibly it points to Lower Egypt and Sinai, since Double Falcon's name has been found only at these two sites.

A second unusual serekh is that of King Hor-Aha. It shows the Horus falcon reaching into the serekh with his claws and holding a mace and a shield, forming the word Aha, meaning "fighter of Horus". The arrangement is intriguing, because normally the Horus falcon and the hieroglyphs inside the serekh were out of reach and independent of one another. The motive and deeper meaning of Aha's serekh are unknown.

== Female Horus name ==
=== Use by queens regnant ===
When ruling pharaoh was a woman, a feminine ending "-t" was being added to bird symbol in her Horus name. The first attested female Horus name was granted to the first woman known to rule Egypt in her own right, Sobekneferu of 12th dynasty. Among next female pharaohs, female Horus name was recorded to be used by:

- Hatshepsut of 18th dynasty
- Tawosret of 19th dynasty
- Cleopatra III of Ptolemaic dynasty
- Cleopatra VII of Ptolemaic dynasty

=== Use by priestesses and royal consorts ===
Between rule of Tawosret and Ptolemaic queens, Horus name was used by the God's Wife of Amun Nitocris I, who is not considered to be Pharaoh.

During the Ptolemaic period meaning of Horus name seemed to undergone some changes. While still used by kings and queens regnant, it was also bore by two queens consorts: Berenice II and Cleopatra I Syra, which some researchers interpreted as evidence of achieving by aforementioned queens status of pharaohs; however, Tara Sewell-Lasater points that was not the case, as neither Berenice nor Syra were recognized by Egyptian administration as rulers at the time of being given this title. She instead proposes that granting the two royal consorts status of female Horus had religious and politicial meaning of showing them as being a support and a complementation to their husbands:

Conferring Berenike with titles like “female Horus” and “female pharaoh” produced an image of Berenike as the equal of Ptolemy. While, in reality, Ptolemy had the final say in governance and Berenike acted in a supporting role, Berenike being presented as equal to her husband in both dynastic imagery and title created a perception of equality. Just as a perception of power was created for Arsinoë, so too did Berenike present a perception of power and equality in rulership that the later queens of the dynasty would emulate, and Berenike, in the titles she was presented with, acted as the model for the later co-rulerships of the dynasty, even though she did not truly participate in one herself.

... Kleopatra [I Syra] was also granted a Horus name ..., the royal titulary of Hr.t (“female Horus”), which was a title previously held by Berenike II. Also similarly to Berenike II, in the Demotic sections of the Philae Decrees Kleopatra was titled “ruler” (hk3.t) and “female pharaoh”. For Kleopatra I, since these titles were granted to her before her husband’s death and before she became regent for their young son, they cannot be titles that were conferred on her to indicate her personal rulership, as has been previously claimed.
Rather, and similarly to what was proposed for Berenike II, the conferral of these titles on Kleopatra must have been done to further present Kleopatra I and Ptolemy V as one ruling unit. Since Kleopatra was a foreign princess those loyalties could be questioned, she needed a title of corresponding titular equality to those held by Ptolemy to complete the concept that she and her husband were a royal unit acting in harmony, both religiously and politically.

== See also ==
- Nebty name
- Serekh
