= Serekh =

Type of ancient Egyptian heraldic crest

Serekh in hieroglyphs
S29 r Aa1 O33
(Unicode: 𓊁 )
srḫ/ serekh
façade (of the palace)

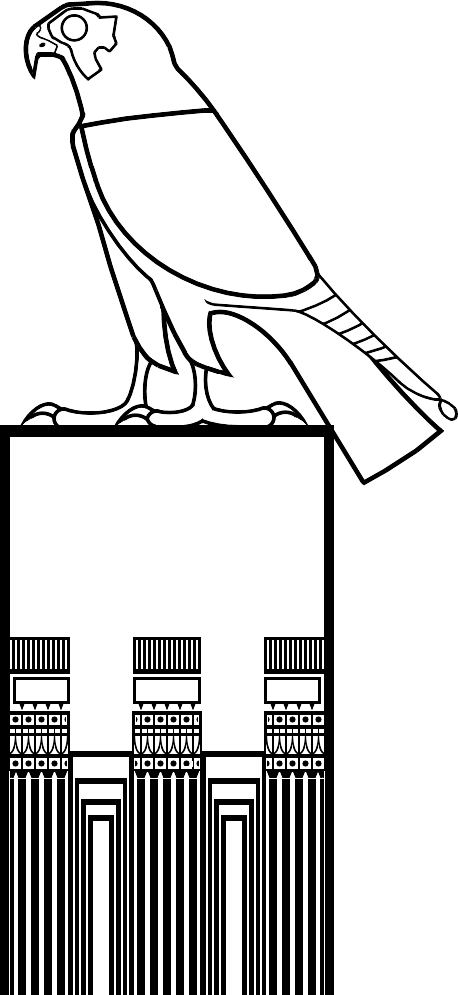
Horus serekh, heavily embellished form

In Egyptian hieroglyphs, a serekh is a rectangular enclosure representing the niched or gated façade of a palace surmounted by (usually) the Horus falcon, indicating that the text enclosed is a royal name. The serekh was the earliest convention used to set apart the royal name in ancient Egyptian iconography, predating the later and better known cartouche by four dynasties and five to seven hundred years.

== Appearance ==
A serekh was an ornamental vignette combining a view of a palace façade and a plan (top view) of the royal courtyard. The term serekh derives from the Egyptian word for "façade". Different serekhs on different types of object display countless variations of the façade decor in its complexity and detail. It seems that no strict artistic rules for the design of the serekh itself existed.

== History ==
The serekh first appears as an ornamental miniature during the late Gerzeh culture, when it was used as a royal crest only. From the Old Kingdom period onward, the first uses of the full written word appear in old papyri.

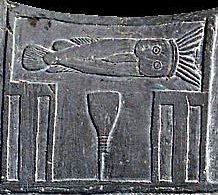
Serekhs bearing the rebus symbols n'r (catfish) and mr (chisel) inside, being the phonetic representation of king Narmer's name on the Narmer Palette, circa 3100 BC

A serekh was normally used as a royal crest, accentuating and honouring the name of the pharaoh. Its use can be dated back as early as the Gerzeh culture (c. 3400 BC). The hieroglyphs forming the king's name were placed inside a rectangular extension atop the serekh, which represented the royal courtyard. Additionally, the falcon of the god Horus, or in a few cases the Set animal, topped the serekh, showing the celestial patron of the named king.

If the word "serekh" was written in full letters (as shown in the infobox above), sometimes accompanied by a miniature of the serekh, it could also be used in text.

One of the most important elements of royal display and identity in ancient Egypt was the king's name, important as pharaohs were concerned that future generations remain aware of their reigns. These were first seen from rulers as early as those of Dynasty 0 and continued to be used by kings throughout the history of ancient Egypt. For example, a serekh of Senusret I, who was a king during the Twelfth Dynasty, has been found and is now displayed at the Metropolitan Museum of Art in New York City. The serekhs of kings from the 30th Dynasty can also be seen. The serekh represented the king's palace shown in a combination of plan and elevation. The rectangular enclosure represented the plan while the patterned area represented the elevation of the façade. A serekh incised or painted in ink on a vessel denoted that the contents were the produce and/or property of the royal court. The serekh containing the king's name was used on a variety of objects and made a fundamental statement of royal ideology. The king's name was written in hieroglyphs and the Horus falcon, in reference to the sky god Horus, usually surmounted it.

The Horus name is the first of five royal titles that were in use by the Fifth Dynasty. The second title is the (He of the) Two Ladies, representing the king as manifesting, and under the protection of, the goddesses Nekhbet of Elkab and Hierakonpolis in Upper Egypt, and Wadjet of Buto in Lower Egypt. The third title is the Horus of Gold, with the Horus falcon above the hieroglyphic sign for gold. The fourth title is often translated as "He of the Sedge and Bee", with the sedge plant symbolic of Upper Egypt and the bee symbolic of Lower Egypt. This is also known as nswt-bìty, a title which expressed the many dualities over which the king exercised rule: Upper and Lower Egypt, the Black Land of cultivation and the Red Land of desert, the realms of day and night, and the natural and the supernatural. The fifth title is Son of Ra. This name claims a direct solar origin for the king as child of the sun-god. The Horus name was commonly written in the serekhs of ancient Egypt. There are a couple of cases in which the Horus name appears without serekhs, and only Peribsen and Khasekhemwy have serekhs without the Horus name.

== Horus ==
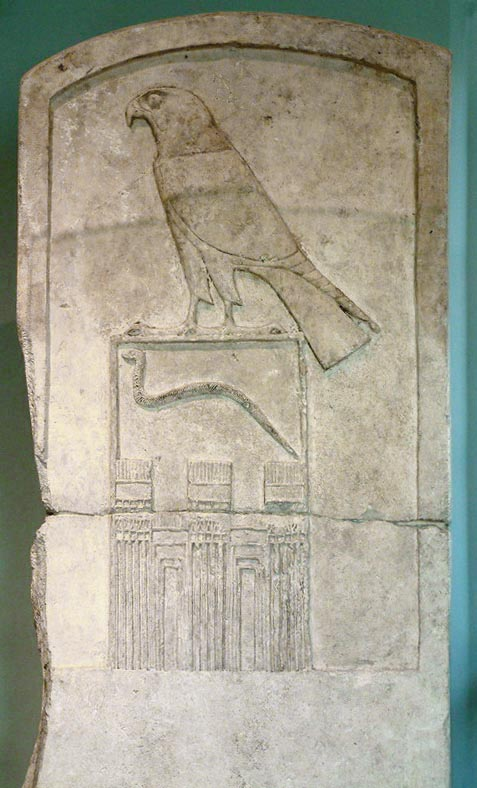
Serekh of Pharaoh Djet, 1st Dynasty, with his name framed by the royal serekh and surmounted by the Horus falcon. This particular stela is from his tomb at Abydos and can now be found at The Art Archive/Musée du Louvre Paris/Dagli Orti. This funerary stela is one of two that would have been placed on the east side of his Abydos tomb to mark the place where offerings were to be made. The width of the stela is approximately 65 centimeters, and its height approximately 143 centimeters.

The king's name was written in hieroglyphs and the Horus falcon, in reference to the god Horus, usually surmounted it. As a result, the king's name in the serekh came to be known by Egyptologists as his 'Horus name.' The writing of the king's name within the serekh symbolized the king in his palace as the center of royal administration and power. The serekh as a whole was therefore a symbol of kingship. The presence of the Horus falcon showed that the living king was a manifestation of the god. Additionally, the Horus names of several First Dynasty kings expressed the aggressive authority of Horus, perhaps reflecting the coercive power of kingship at this early stage of Egyptian statehood. Examples of such names are 'Horus the fighter' (Hor-Aha), 'Horus the strong' (Djer), and 'arm-raising Horus' (Qa'a). All of these names reveal the warlike iconography of the earliest royal monuments from the period of state formation. They emphasize an authority based upon military strength and the power of life and death. The emphasis in the Second Dynasty, however, began to change possibly due to the periods of instability that the kings faced, though the exact reason is still disputed. This led to a slight alteration in the structure of the serekh, solely during the reigns of Peribsen and Khasekhemwy. Since this alteration only occurred during these two reigns, it is seen as an exception, as the succeeding kings returned to the previous iconography.

== Progression ==
The earliest serekhs were empty because the symbol alone relayed the necessary message of royal power. Over time, the king began to write an epithet within the serekh. These serekhs were dominated by the symbol of Horus. During the Second Dynasty only, changes in the formulation of the Horus name to a Seth-name and then a Horus-and-Seth name were seen. These changes occurred merely during the Second Dynasty and are viewed as an exception to the typical use of the Horus name as is evidenced by the continued use of Horus in the serekhs of the Egyptian kings before and after Peribsen and Khasekhemwy. Many propositions have been made as to why this change occurred, though the exact reason is still disputed.

== Peribsen and Khasekhemwy ==
Line drawing of an inscription displaying the serekh of Peribsen, with Seth-animal and sun-disk. From a porphyry vase.

For reasons which remain unclear, Seth attained particular prominence in the late Second Dynasty, temporarily replacing, then joining, Horus as the god atop the royal serekh. When the name Peribsen, who was the penultimate king of the Second Dynasty, was written in a serekh, it was surmounted, not by the usual Horus falcon hieroglyph, but by the Seth animal, a hound or jackal-like creature with a wide, straight tail.

Peribsen thus made a visual statement that he was the earthly embodiment of Seth. The importance of Seth in the reign of Peribsen was also reflected in a sealing of the king from Abydos. It referred to a god named 'the golden one' or, perhaps more likely, 'he of Nubt (Naqada)', the usual epithet of Seth in historic times. It appears as though Seth was adopted by Peribsen as his personal deity and later also led the cult. This is emphasized by the wording of the inscription: 'He of Nubt has handed over the Two Lands to his son, the dual king Peribsen'.

The other dramatic change in the format of the royal name is that of the last king of the dynasty, Khasekhemwy, whose name appeared in serekhs surmounted by both the Horus falcon and the Seth animal. Originally known as Khasekhem, which means 'The One who Arises in respect of the Power', his serekh was toped by the Horus falcon, thus the "power" in the name is referring to Horus. This suggests that Khasekhem was loyal to the cult of Horus and led it. This ineviatebly led to a civil war between the followers of the god Horus led by himself and the followers of the god Seth led by Peribsen. Either way, Khasekhem was able to end the infighting of the Second dynasty and reunite Egypt by his 12th year on the throne, since the Palermo Stone first refers to him as "the Dual King" by his 13th year.

Later, after reunifying Egypt, his name became to be known as Khasekhemwy which means 'The One who Arises in respect of the Two Powers'. The 'Two Powers' in his name have been interpreted by some as the Horus falcon and the Seth animal. One interpretation of this dramatic change in the format of the royal name is that it represented a rebellion of some kind that was quashed or reconciled by the last king of the dynasty, Khasekhemwy, The addition to Khasekhemwy's name is further evidence that he was trying to merge the ideas of, or at least reconcile the followers both Horus and Seth.

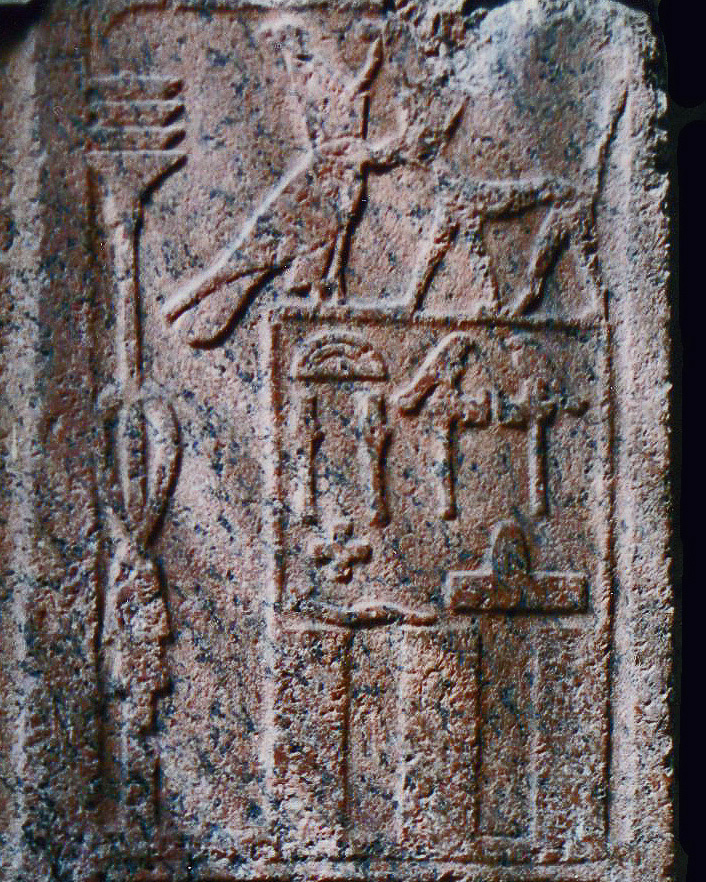
Serekh of king Khasekhemwy with both Horus and Seth above

While the validity of this proposal is debatable, Khasekhemwy's epithet from seal impressions supports this notion. It is interpreted as 'the Two Lords are at peace in him' which can be viewed as though he resolved some internal conflict, especially if 'Two Lords' are seen as referring to Horus and Seth and their followers, respectively. Others have viewed this evidence as a way of proclaiming national renewal under Khasekhemwy as he was able to reunite Upper and Lower Egypt. This idea remains speculative, however, due to the lack of hard evidence to support this notion, and the fact that after his death, Seth was dropped from the serekh permanently. Nonetheless, it seems likely that foreign relations reached a new level under Khasekhemwy, since a seal-impression of his reign showed the first occurrence of the title ìmì-r3 h3st which means 'overseer of foreign land(s)'. It strongly suggests the imposition of Egyptian hegemony on foreign territory.

The change of the deity image on a serekh was significant: While the king's name sometimes appeared in a serekh without an image of a deity above, no deity other than Horus is so far known to have occurred on the serekh of a king until the reign of Peribsen. However, the serekhs of some queens had other deities above. An example is Neithotep's, whose serekh had the goddess Neith's emblems above it. Due to evidence that Peribsen's stelae were subjected to erasure of the Seth animals, it has been inferred that whatever reasons Peribsen had for substituting his falcon failed to win acceptance among royal generations after Khasekhemwy.

== See also ==
- Ancient Egyptian royal titulary
- Eye of Horus
- Horus name
