= Crocodile (pharaoh) =

Provisional name of an Egyptian predynastic ruler

- Shendjw
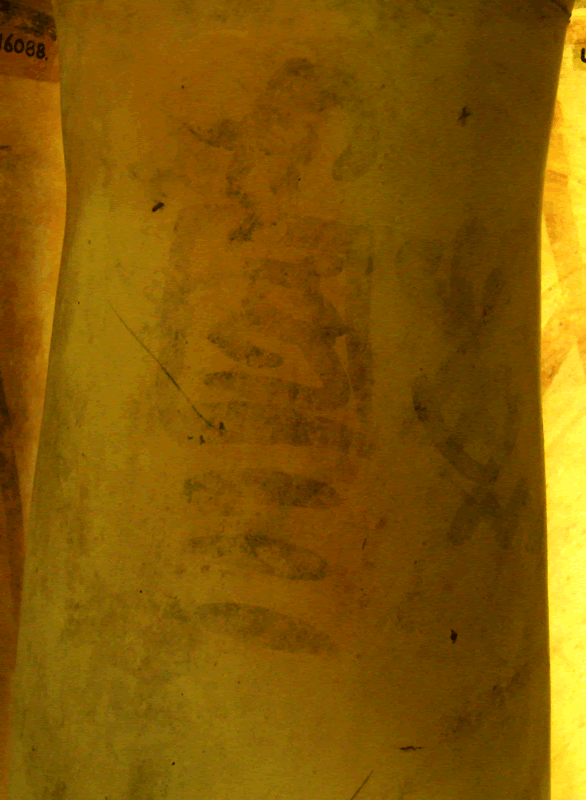
- Black ink inscription from Tarkhan

Pharaoh
- Reign: Naqada III
- Predecessor: Scorpion I?
- Successor: Iry-Hor?
Royal titulary
Horus name
Hor-Shendjw
Šndjw
The subduer
G5	I3 V1
- Burial: TT 1549, Tarkhan (?)
- Dynasty: Predynastic Egypt

Crocodile (also read as Shendjw; fl. c. 3170 BC) is the provisional name of a predynastic ruler, who ruled during the late Naqada III epoch. Crocodile was known as a usurper at the time of Narmer. The few alleged ink inscriptions showing his name are drawn very sloppily, and the reading and thus whole existence of king "Crocodile" are highly disputed. His tomb is unknown.

== Name sources ==
The proposed existence of Crocodile is based on Günter Dreyer's and Edwin van den Brink's essays. They are convinced that Crocodile was a local king who ruled at the region of Tarkhan. According to Dreyer, Crocodile's name appears in black ink inscriptions on burnt earthen jars and on several seal impressions found in tomb TT 1549 at Tarkhan and tomb B-414 at Abydos. He sees a crawling crocodile and a rope curl beneath it and reads Shendjw ("the subduer"). Van den Brink thinks alike and reads Shendjw, too, but sees only a large rope curl sign inside the serekh.

== Reign and datation ==
Almost nothing is known about Crocodile's reign. If he existed, he might have had his capital at Tarkhan, where his proposed tomb was excavated. Dreyer places him in a time shortly before the kings Iry-Hor, Ka and Narmer. He points to guiding inscriptions on the jars mentioning a Hen-mehw ("brought from Lower Egypt"). This specific diction of designations of origin is archaeologically proven for the time before three mentioned kings, from King Ka onward, it was Inj-mehw (with the same meaning).

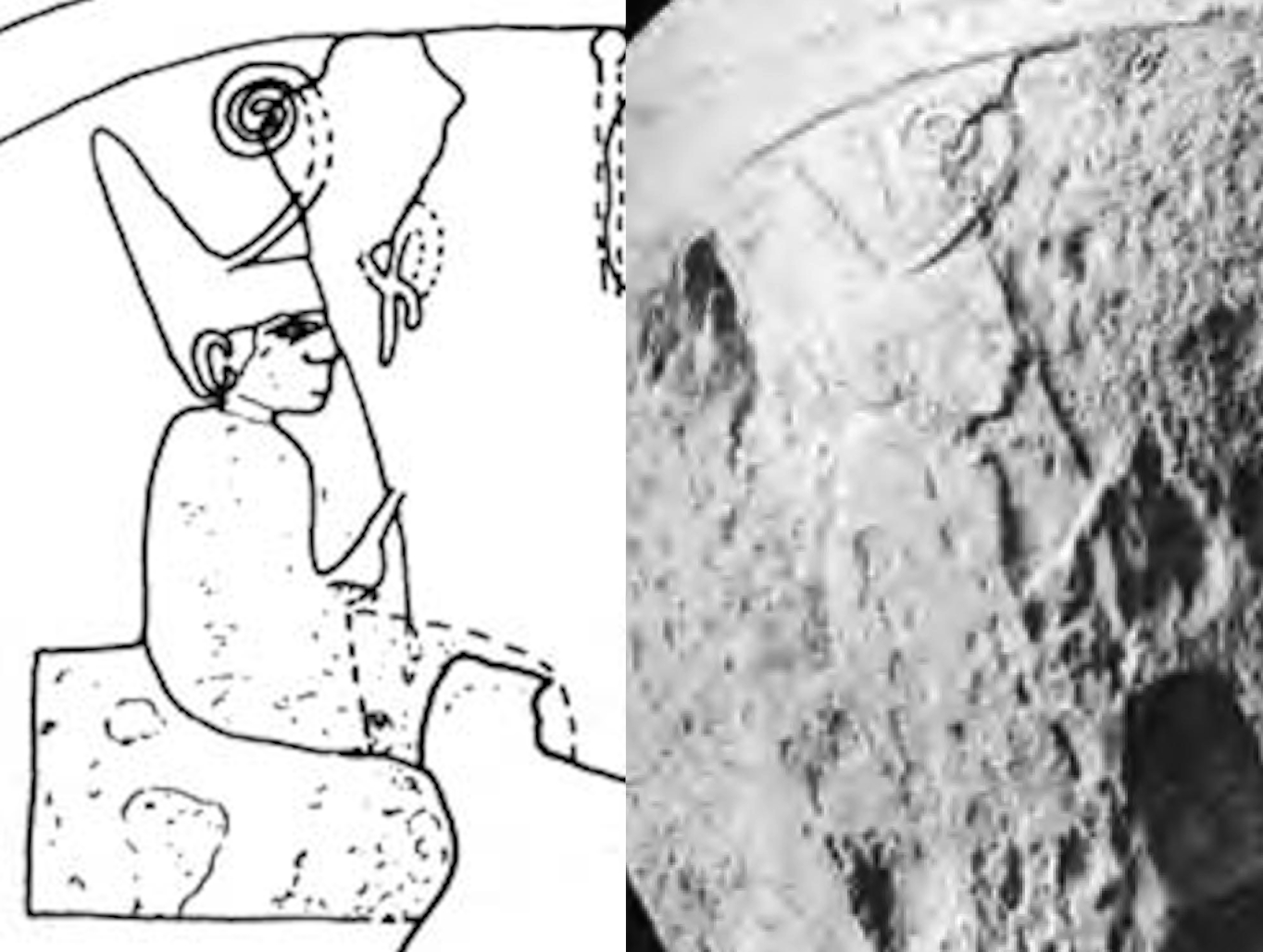
The King's Macehead, which may depict Crocodile or Scorpion II

One artifact that possibly depicts King Crocodile, was found at Hierakonpolis in the so-called Main deposit. The artifact is a piece of a broken mace head which shows traces of a once-completed relief scene. The conserved part of the relief shows the head and upper torso of a seated king figure inside a hebsed-pavilion. It wears the White Crown of Upper Egypt, a hebsed cloak and a flail. Right before the face of the king traces of a golden rosette (the predynastic crest of the kings) and a certain hieroglyph are visible. All but the hieroglyph are damaged, leaving room for interpretations. Mainstream Egyptologists consider the sign to be either the name of Crocodile or King Scorpion II.

A clay seal impression from Minshat Abu Omar is also of special interest to Egyptologists: in the centre of the impression it shows a serekh-like frame with a bucranium above and a crocodile crawling through grass inside. Right of this crest a divine standard is depicted, a recumbent crocodile with two projectings (either lotus buds or ostrich feathers) sprouting out of its back and is sitting on that standard. The whole arrangement is surrounded by rows of crocodiles with rope curls beneath, which seems to point to the proposed reading of Crocodile's royal serekh. But Egyptologists Van den Brink and Ludwig David Morenz argue against the idea that the seal impression talks about the ruler. In their opinion, the inscription celebrates the foundation of a shrine for the god Sobek at a city named Shedyt (alternatively Shedet). The city and the shrine are known from Old Kingdom inscriptions; the main cult centre was located at Medinet el-Fayum. For this reason, Sobek was worshipped during early dynasties as "Sobek of Shedyt".

== See also ==
- List of pharaohs
