= Scorpion II =

Protodynastic Egyptian king

Scorpion
- Weha, Selk
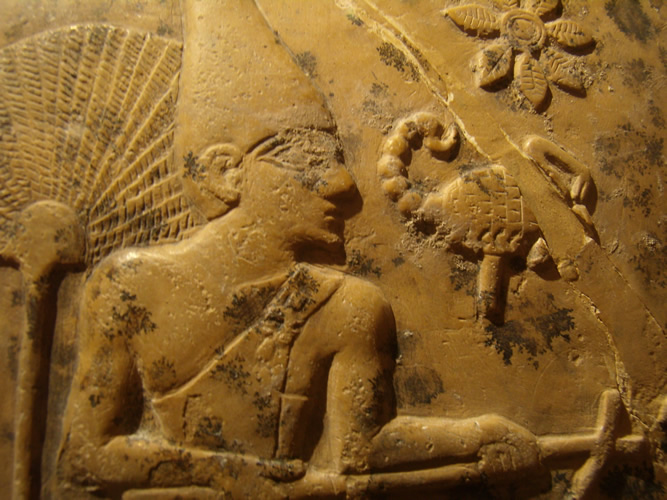
- Pharaoh Scorpion II on the Scorpion Macehead, Ashmolean Museum

Pharaoh
- Reign: c. 32nd century BC
- Predecessor: Ka?
- Successor: Narmer?
Royal titulary
Horus name
Weha / Selk
Wḥˁ / Srq
Scorpion ?
Z1or

G5	HD
- Dynasty: Dynasty 0

Scorpion II (Ancient Egyptian: possibly Selk or Weha), also known as King Scorpion, was a ruler during the Protodynastic Period of Upper Egypt (c. 3200-3000 BC).

== Identity ==
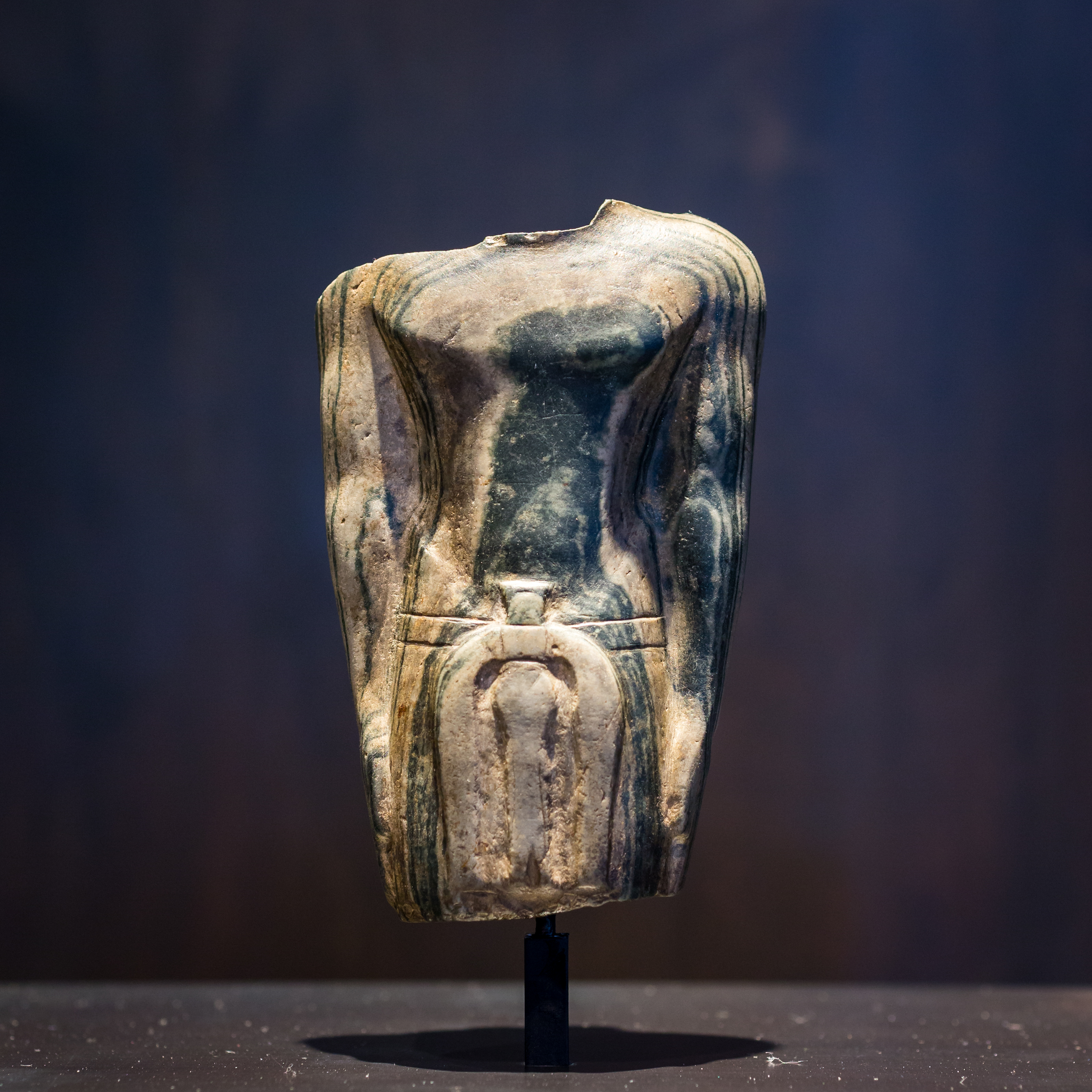
Torso of a man with the Horus name of King Scorpion below the left breast. Anorthositic gneiss, Protodynastic period, circa 3200 BC. Munich, Staatliches Museum Ägyptischer Kunst, ÄS 7149

=== Name ===
King Scorpion's name and title are of great dispute in modern Egyptology. His name is often introduced by a six- or seven-leafed golden rosette or flower sign. This emblem can be found on numerous objects from the Dynasty 0 and Dynasty I periods; it vanishes until the end of the Third Dynasty, when it re-appears under high-ranked officials, such as Khabawsokar and Akhetaa (both dated to the end of the Third Dynasty). Its precise meaning has been intensely discussed; the most common interpretation is that of an emblem meaning 'nomarch' or 'high lord'. During the protodynastic and early dynastic eras, it was evidently used as a designation for kings; in much later periods, it was bestowed on high-ranked officials and princes, especially on those who served as priests for the goddess Seshat. Thus, the golden rosette became an official emblem of Seshat. The reading of the rosette sign is also disputed. Most linguists and Egyptologists read it Neb (for 'lord') or Nesw (for 'king'), and they are convinced that the golden rosette was some kind of forerunner to the later serekh.

The scorpion fetish, which underlies the name of Scorpion II, is generally linked to the later-introduced goddess Selket, but Egyptologists and linguists such as L.D. Morenz, H. Beinlich, Toby Wilkinson and Jan Assmann have pointed out that the goddess was introduced no earlier than the late Old Kingdom period. In this view, the scorpion fetish of the protodynastic period should not be associated with Selket. Morenz points out that, in cases where a fetish animal is included in a ruler's name, the animal generally has a different, rather cultic and political meaning. The scorpion animal commonly stood for dangerous things, such as 'poison' and 'illness', but it could also mean 'bad breath', or in military contexts 'storm' or 'attack'. Since it is unclear what actual meaning was reserved for the serekh animal of Scorpion II, scholars usually refer to him as 'King Scorpion II'.

=== Historical figure ===
There are several theories regarding his identity and chronological position. Some Egyptologists, such as Bernadette Menu, argue that, because Egyptian kings of the First Dynasty seem to have had multiple names, Scorpion was the same person as Narmer, simply with an alternative name, or additional title. They also argue that the artistic style seen on the macehead of Scorpion II shows conspicuous similarities to that on the famous Narmer macehead. Other scholars, including T. H. Wilkinson, Renée Friedman and Bruce Trigger, have identified king Scorpion II as the 'Gegenkönig' (opponent ruler) of Narmer and Ka (or Sekhen). At the time of Scorpion II, Egypt was divided into several minor kingdoms that were fighting each other. It is likewise conjectured that Narmer simply conquered the realms of Ka and Scorpion II, thus unifying the whole of Egypt for the first time.

== Attestations ==
=== Macehead ===
Scorpion Macehead

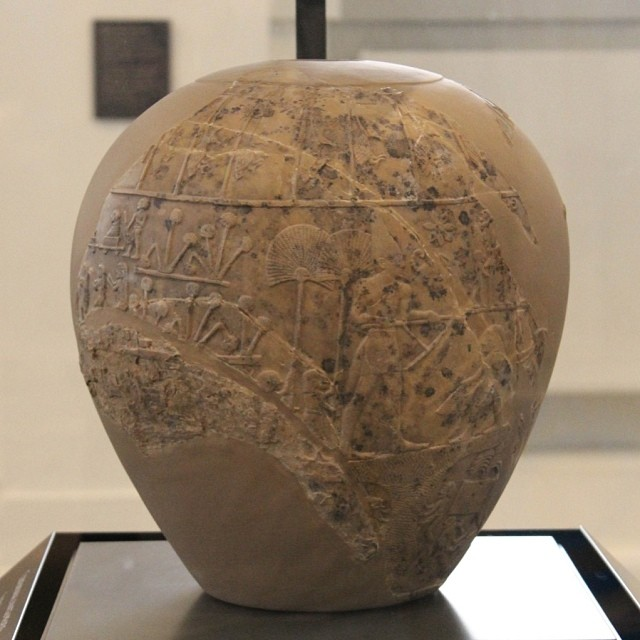
Macehead of Scorpion II

Scorpion II on the macehead (drawing)

The only pictorial evidence of his existence is the so-called Scorpion Macehead, which was found in the Main deposit by archeologists James E. Quibell and Frederick W. Green in a temple at Nekhen (Hierakonpolis) during the dig season of 1897–1898. It is currently on display at the Ashmolean Museum, Oxford. The stratigraphy of this macehead was lost due to the methods of its excavators, but its style seems to date it to the very end of the Predynastic Period.

The Scorpion Macehead depicts a single, large figure wearing the White Crown of Upper Egypt. He holds a hoe, which has been interpreted as a ritual either involving the pharaoh ceremonially cutting the first furrow in the fields, or opening the dikes to flood them. The use and placement of the iconography is similar to the depiction of the pharaoh Narmer on the obverse side of the Narmer Palette. The king is preceded by servants, the first in row seems to throw seeds from a basket into the freshly hacked ground. A second servant (his depiction is partially damaged) wears a huge bundle of grain sheafs, which strengthens the interpretation of a seed sowing ceremony, possibly connected to the Sed festival or a founding ceremony. Scorpion II may have been the founder of Nekhen or Buto, which would explain why the macehead was found in Hierakonpolis. Above the servants, a row of standard bearers, who carry the same standards as seen on the Narmer palette, precede the king. Below the royal servants, a road and a landscape with people and houses is preserved.

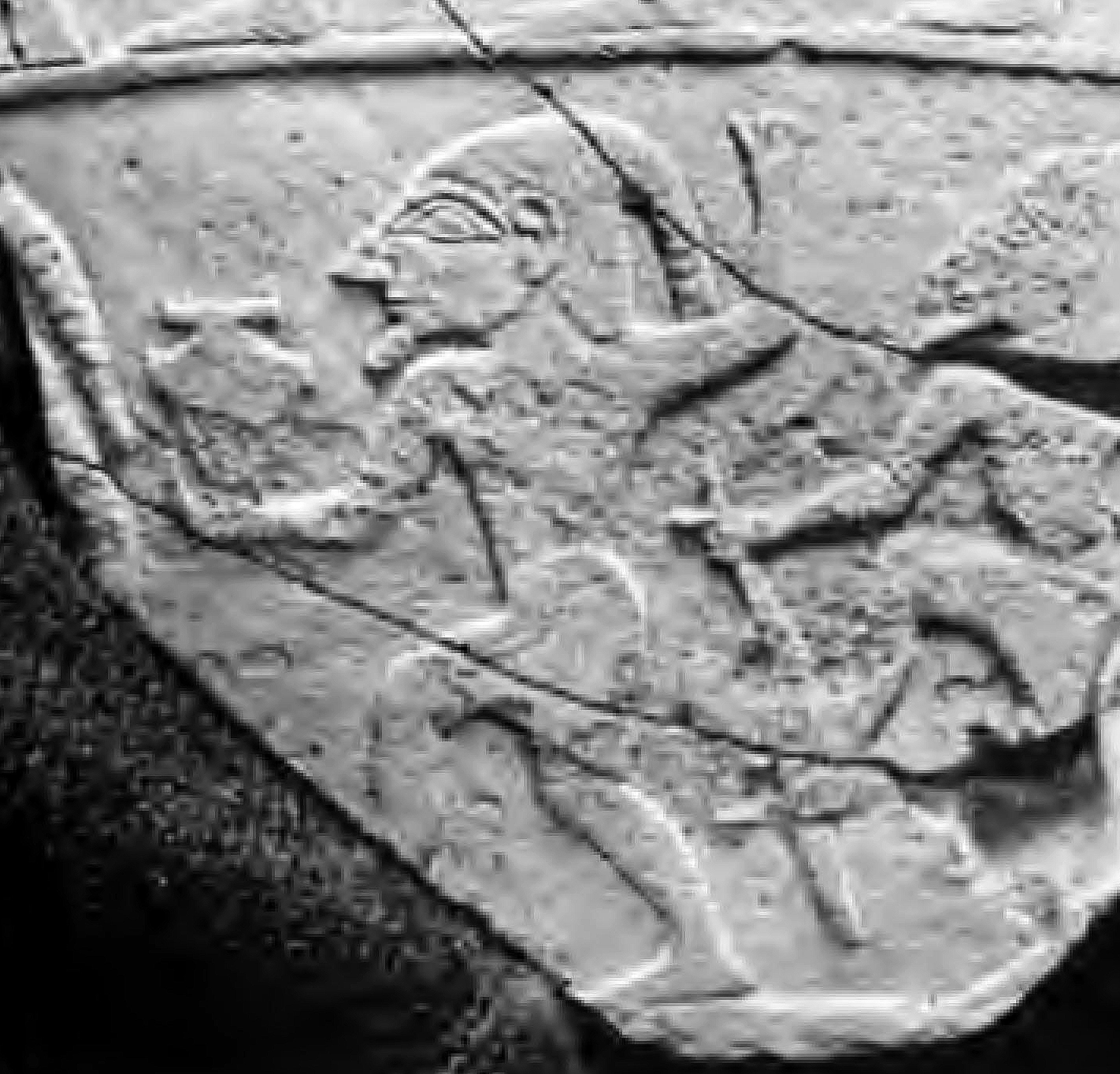
An individual with offerings, on King Scorpion's Minor Macehead

Behind the king (on the left side) two fan bearers follow the king. Left of the fan bearer, bundles of papyrus groves are depicted. Behind these, in the upper section, a group of dancers and a priest are visible; the priest guards a Repw.t-palanquin. The lower section is lost due to damage. The festive parade looks into the opposite direction of the king and his standard bearers; an outstretched complete view reveals that both processions meet each other in the center of the whole macehead relief scene. In this very center, scholars such as K. M. Ciałowicz, E. J. Baumgärtel and T. H. Wilkinson believe that they see the tiny traces of the feet and the coil of the Red Crown; a second golden rosette is clearly visible. The traces strengthen the presumption that the scene on the Scorpion macehead once contained the depiction of a second figure of the king, wearing the Red Crown of Lower Egypt. In this case, the Scorpion macehead would show king Scorpion II as the ruler of the whole of Egypt.

The uppermost scene on the macehead shows a row of divine standards. Each standard is surmounted by a god (Set, Min and Nemty, for example) or nome crest. The original number of standards is unknown, but it is clearly visible that one half shows hanged lapwings, the other shows hanged hunting bows. Both standard rows face each other. Lapwings stood for 'Lower Egyptian folks' or 'common folks' and the bows stood for 'folk of archers', pointing to hostile Asian tribes. Their hanging is interpreted as evidence that Scorpion II began the attacks on Lower Egypt and Egyptian enemies at the border lands, which eventually resulted in Narmer's victory and unification of the country.

=== Ivory tags ===
Numerous small ivory tags showing the depiction of a scorpion were found. They come from Abydos, Minshat Abu Omar and Tarkhan. Some of them show the scorpion holding the hieroglyphic sign for "nome/garden/land" (Gardiner sign N24) and it is disputed, if this clear sign combination has a deeper meaning: the scorpion could represent King Scorpion II in his role as a ruler of a certain (but unnamed) nome. Some other tags show the scorpion close over a swallow sign, which reads 'the scorpion is great'. One unique tag shows the scorpion holding a long stick, smiting an enemy. Since many of the tags show a shrine with a heron on the roof at the backsite, it is thought that Scorpion II originated from Buto.

=== Rock and vessel inscriptions ===
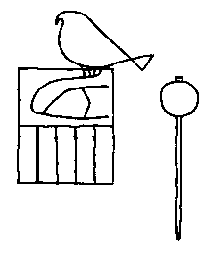
Clay mark with the name of king Scorpion II (after Dietrich Wildung)

At Tarkhan and Minshat Abu Omar, several stone and clay vessels were found. They have royal serekhs incarved at their bellies and the reading of the name inside is disputed. Several Egyptologists (including Thomas Schneider, Dietrich Wildung and Herman TeVelde) are convinced that the serekhs present a strongly stylized figure of a scorpion. Others, such as Günter Dreyer and Wolfgang Helck, are not so sure and read it as a sloppily drawn version of the name of King Ka.

At the second cataract of the Nile, not far from the Nasser-reservoire at Gebel Sheikh Suliman (Sudan), a large rock cutting depicts a big scorpion figure striding over killed enemies. Their death is demonstrated by depicting them standing upside-down and being hit by arrows; two further figures are still holding their own bows and shooting. The enemies can be identified as Nubians, due to their ostrich feathers and bows, since ostrich feathers and bows were the typical attributes for Egyptians to mark Nubians. The scorpion faces a human figure with an artificial beard and ceremonial knife in a belt; the figure holds a long cord, to which captured Nubians are tied. The whole scene is interpreted as representing King Scorpion II celebrating his victory against the hostile Nubians.

== Reign ==
=== Political situation ===
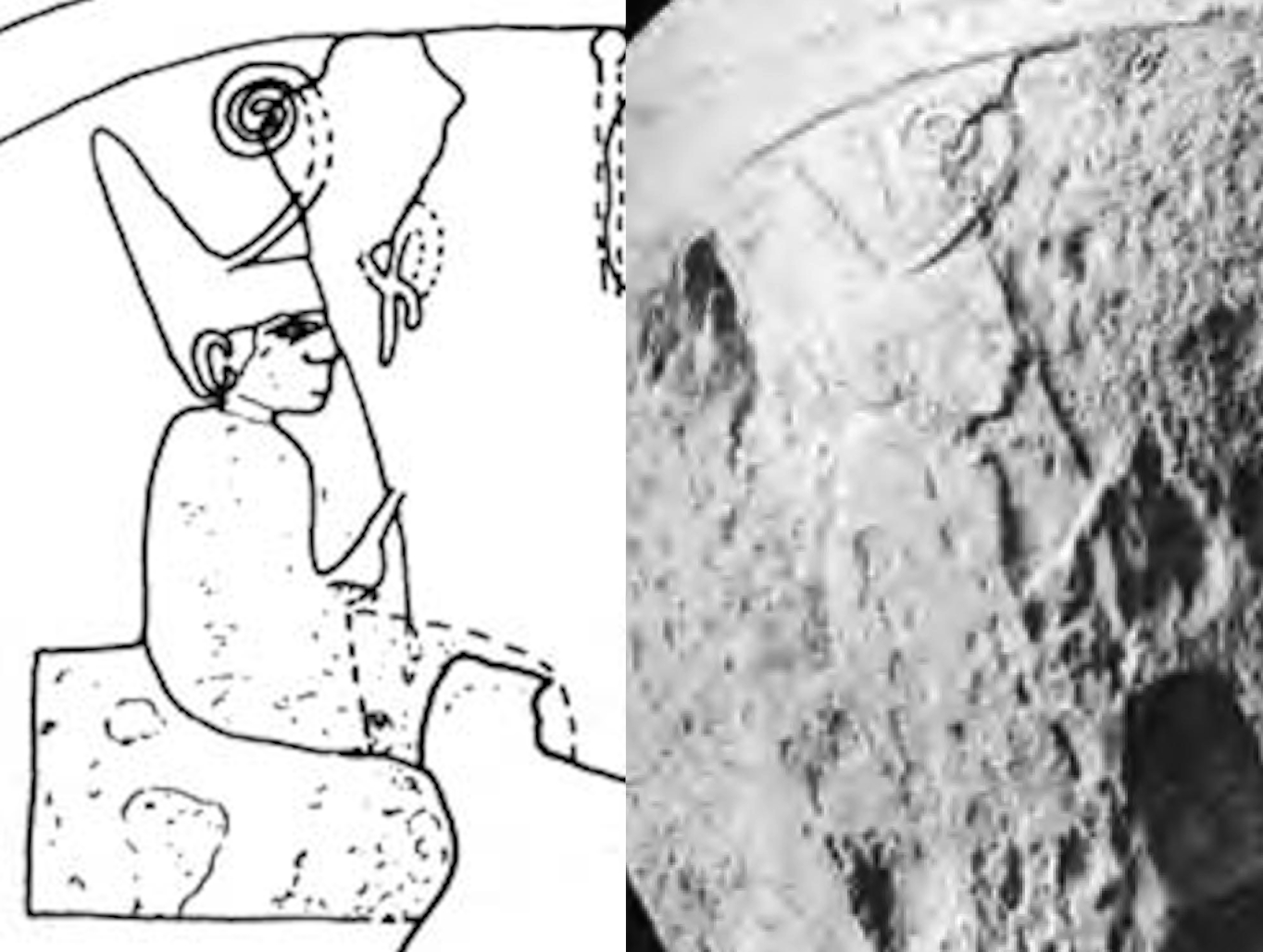
Possible Scorpion II wearing the Red crown. Minor Scorpion Macehead. UC 14898, Petrie Museum.

Numerous artifacts with relief decoration and pottery markings made of black ink point to a flourishing trade economy at the time of Scorpion's rulership. For the first time, the inscriptions give the hieroglyphic writings for 'Lower Egypt' and/or 'Upper Egypt'. Therefore, both parts of Egypt slowly started to work together. But, since it seems clear that Egypt was divided into at least two coexisting kingdoms, scholars wonder on which kind of power factor the rulership of protodynastic kings was based. Conquering and warfare had to be economically promoted, warriors and guardians had to be fed. Based on this cognition, scholars such as K. M Ciałowitz, T. H. Wilkinson, Karl Butzer and Michael A. Hoffman point to the irrigation systems, which were founded in huge quantities. Numerous palettes (such as the Hunters Palette, the Libyan Palette, and the Narmer Palette, for example) and the maceheads of Scorpion II and Narmer show depictions of rivers, plants, trees and several different animals (birds, mammals, and fishes) in surprising natural detail. Alongside these motifs, human figures performing agricultural work are depicted. Ciałowitz, Wilkinson, Butzer and Hoffman see the power source of the protodynastic kings in these agricultural developments. Irrigation systems allowed increasing settlements, cattle possessions and vegetable cultivation. The scholars wonder if the kings kept the irrigations scarce on purpose, to ensure their power, influence and wealth.

=== Religious and cultic situation ===
The numerous decorations on the artifacts also depict large numbers of fetishes and standards, surmounted by gods, which reveals an already very complex religion and cult system. Since the standards often guide the battle scenes, battles and conquests might have been seen as cultic events as well. The earliest recognizable gods are Horus, Seth, Min, Nemty, Nekhbet, Bat, and Wepwawet. But it is unknown where these gods had their cultic centers and shrines, because the hieroglyphs depicting the place names were not introduced yet.

Another aspect of cultic and religious beliefs under Scorpion II are the numerous depictions of mythical creatures, such as the serpopard and the winged chimera. The serpopard appears on the Narmer palette and the Two Dogs Palette. He was named Swdja, which means "undestroyable". In Egyptian mythology the serpopard was described as "the one who moves the sun". On the Narmer palette, two serpopards are entwining their necks. This picture is thought to be an allegoric display of the unification of Egypt. Under Scorpion II, two serpopards are lacerating a gazelle, which might imply that the serpopards were under the control of the king (they attack on command).

The "winged chimeras" were named Sefer in Egyptian and they represent chaos and violence. They appear on the Two-dogs-palette and on several ivory artifacts. Scholars point to the fact that creatures such as the chimera and the serpopards were of Mesopotamian origin.

A further motif of Scorpion's era, clearly of Mesopotamian origin, is that of a warrior fighting two lions with his bare hands. He holds one lion in each hand, both at his sides. A similar motif shows the warrior with two giraffes. In later dynasties, this motif became a hieroglyph, registered as Gardiner A38 and Gardiner A39. It reads Qjs and it was used as the emblem of the city of Cusae.

== Mesopotamian influences under Scorpion II ==
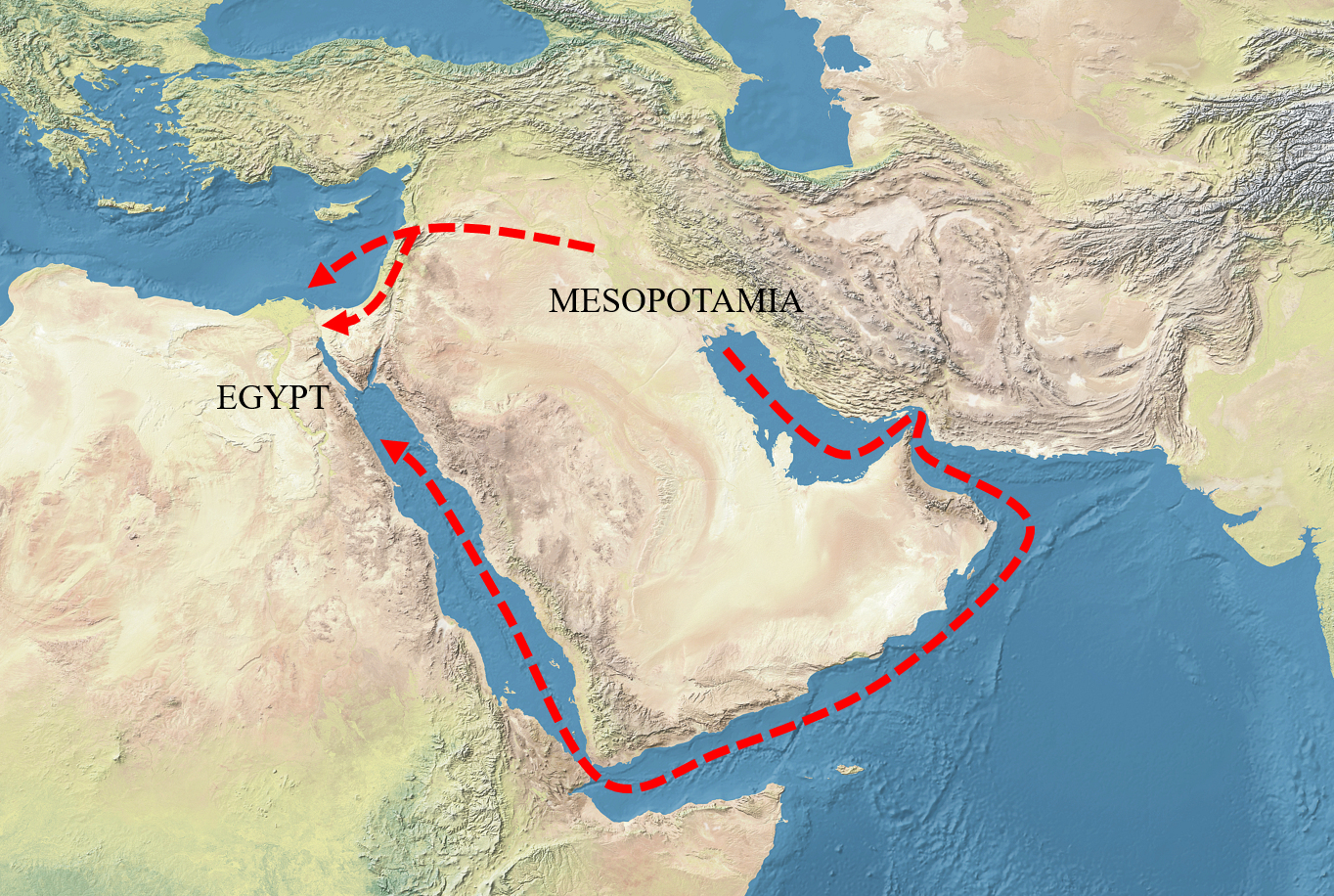
Possible Mesopotamia–Egypt trade routes from the 4th millennium BC

All listed motifs and emblems, but also tomb architecture and traded items (such as tools, bead collars and cylinder seals) prove a surprisingly strong and extensive influence of Mesopotamian culture and religion to the early Egyptians. This cognition is promoted by the evaluations of architectural developments, visible at burial places such as Minshat Abu Omar, Hierakonpolis and Naqada. The architectural methods used for building complex and stable tombs were clearly copied from Mesopotamian buildings.

It is not fully clarified why the Egyptians fostered their amicable relationship with Mesopotamia so intensively; proponents of the Dynastic race theory believe that the first Egyptian chieftains and rulers were themselves of Mesopotamian origin, but this view has been abandoned among modern scholars.

The current position of modern scholarship is that the Egyptian civilization was an indigenous Nile Valley development and that the archaeological evidence "strongly supports an African origin" of the ancient Egyptians. During the rulership of King Scorpion II and his immediate successors, the influence seems to decrease and Egypt begins to foster its own, more independent culture. This surely was a further important step toward Egypt's future as a powerful and wealthy kingdom.

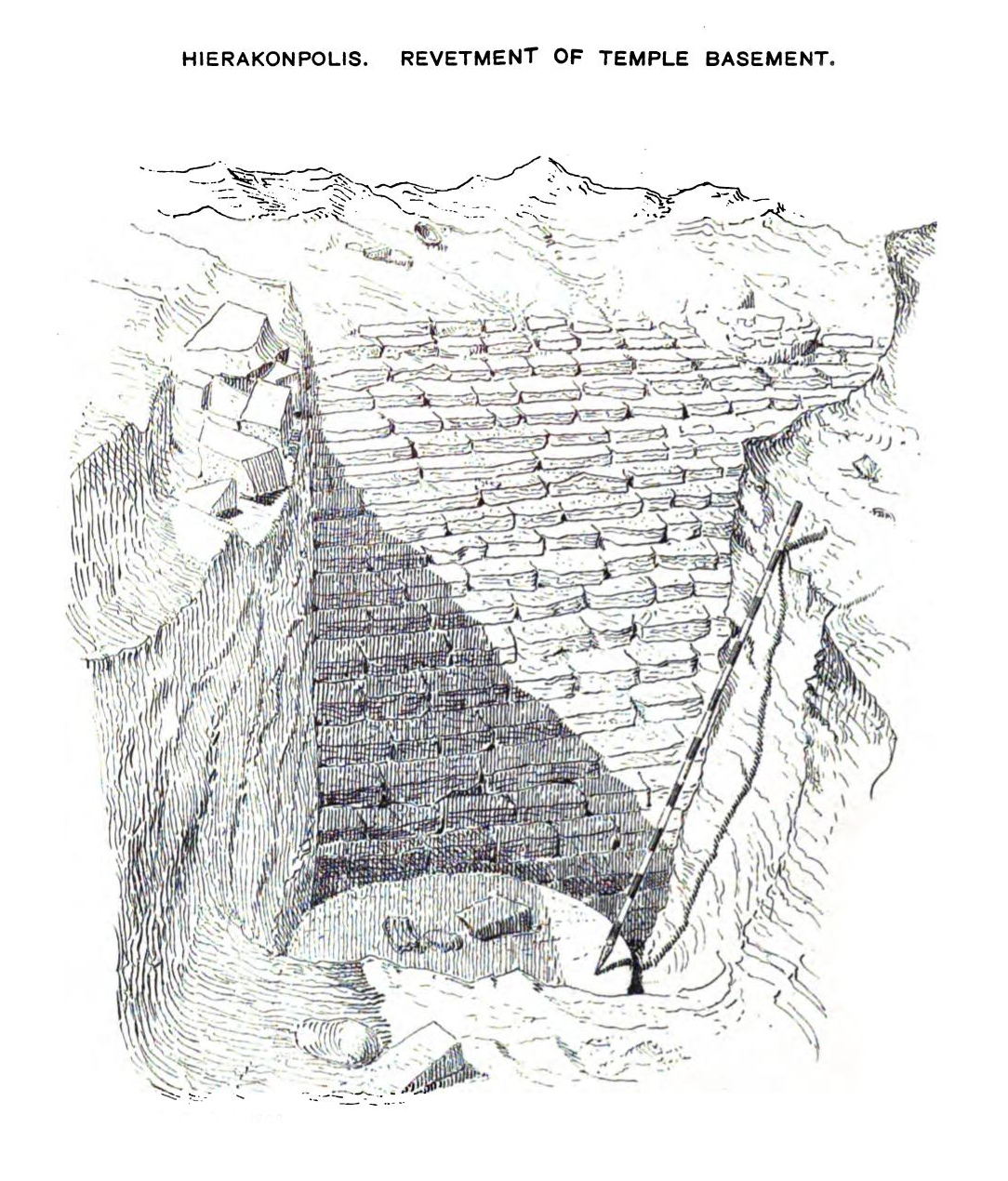
Hierakonpolis revetment of Temple basement

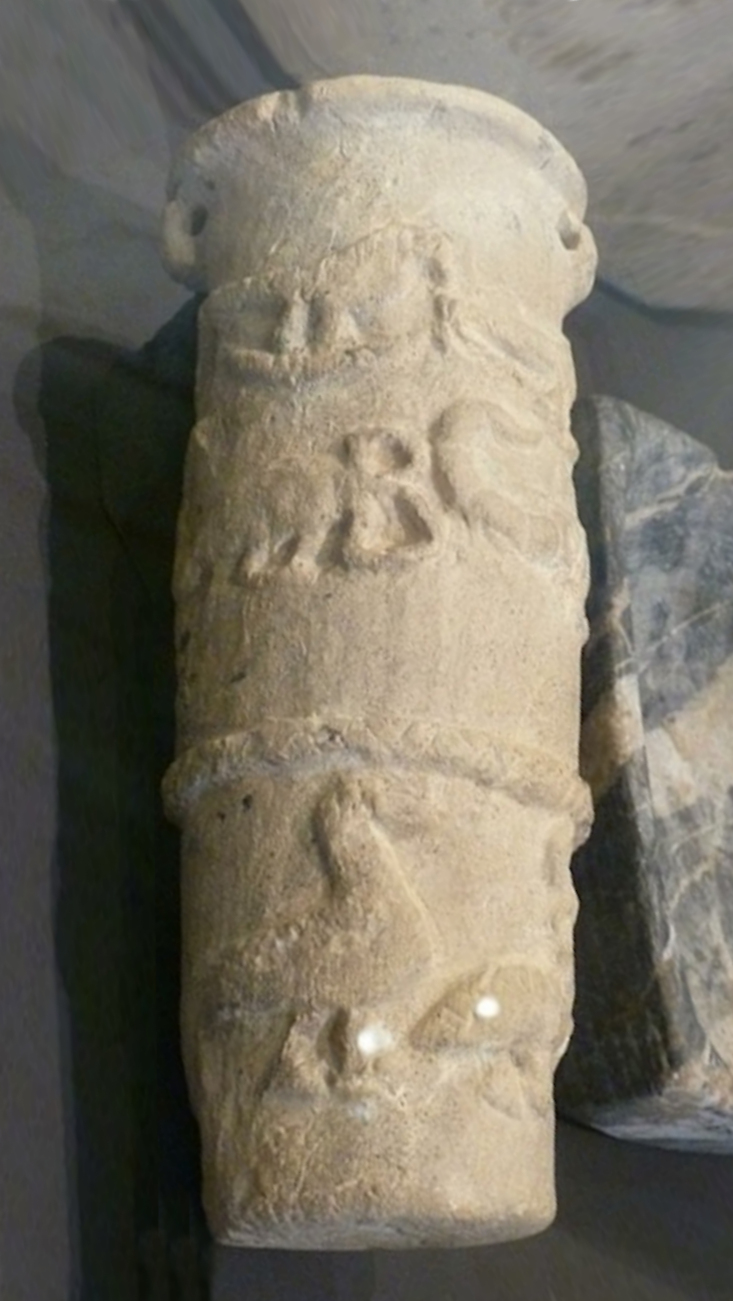
Hierakonpolis cylindrical limestone vase

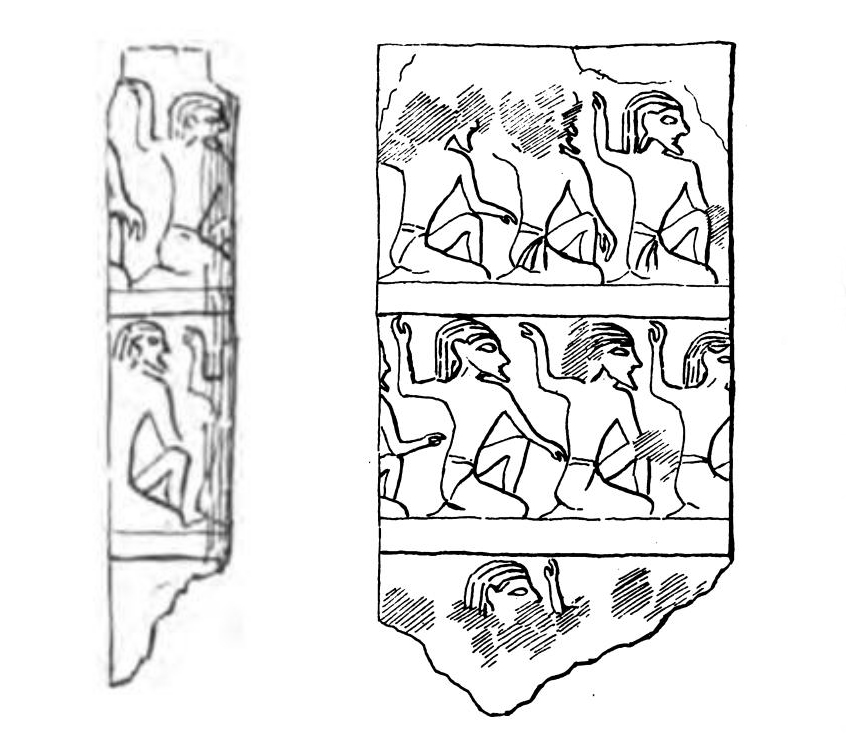
Hierakonpolis ivory cylinder with kneeling men, with impression (drawing)

== Tomb ==
The exact burial place of Scorpion II is unknown. There are two tombs that are both seen as candidates. The first one is registered as Tomb B50 and lies at Umm El Qa'ab (close to Abydos). It is a nearly quadratic chamber divided into four rooms by a simple, cross-shaped mud wall. Several ivory tags with scorpion figures were found here. The second one is located at Hierakonpolis and is registered as Tomb HK6-1. It measures 3.5 m × 6.5 m, has a depth of 2.5 m, and is strengthened with mud. Several ivory tags with scorpion figures were found here.

== Scorpion's name in popular culture ==
- William Golding's 1971 novella The Scorpion God is loosely based upon this period of Egyptian history.
- The Scorpion King's name was used in the 2001 film The Mummy Returns, and its spin-offs The Scorpion King (2002), The Scorpion King 2: Rise of a Warrior (2008), The Scorpion King 3: Battle for Redemption (2012), The Scorpion King 4: Quest for Power (2015), and The Scorpion King: Book of Souls (2018). An action-adventure video game The Scorpion King: Rise of the Akkadian based on the franchise was released in 2002.
- The 2007 children's novel Pharaoh by Jackie French deals with events in the court of King Scorpion, and the rivalry between his sons Narmer and Prince Hawk.

== See also ==
- List of pharaohs
- Naqada culture
- Naqada III
- Scorpion Macehead

== Sources ==
- Assmann, Jan (2003). Stein und Zeit: Mensch und Gesellschaft im Alten Ägypten (in German). München: W. Fink. ISBN 978-3-77-052681-9.
- Hannig, Rainer (2006). Großes Handwörterbuch Ägyptisch-Deutsch: (2800–950 v. Chr.): die Sprache der Pharaonen. Kulturgeschichte der antiken Welt (in German). Vol. 64. Mainz: Philip von Zabern. ISBN 978-3-80-531771-9.
- Kaiser, Werner; Dreyer, Günter (1982). "Umm el-Qaab: Nachuntersuchungen im frühzeitlichen Königsfriedhof. 2. Vorbericht". Mitteilungen des Deutschen archäologischen Instituts (MDAIK). Abteilung Kairo. (in German). 38. Mainz: Philipp von Zabern. ISBN 978-3-80-530552-5.
- Menu, Bernadette (1996). "Enseignes et porte-étendarts". Bulletin de l'Institut Français d'Archéologie Orientale (in French). 96. Cairo: Institut Français d'Archéologie Orientale: 339–342.
- Moortgat, Anton (1994). "Die Goldrosette – ein Schriftzeichen?". Altorientalische Forschungen (in German). 21. Berlin: Institut für Orientforschung: 359–371.
- Needler, Winifred (1967). "A Rock-drawing on Gebel Sheikh Suliman (near Wadi Halfa) showing a Scorpion and human Figures". Journal of the American Research Center in Egypt. 6. Winona Lake: Eisenbrauns: 87–91. doi:10.2307/40000735. JSTOR 40000735.
- Shaw, Ian; Nicholson, Paul (1995). The Dictionary of Ancient Egypt. London: The British Museum Press. ISBN 978-0-71-411909-0.
- Wildung, Dietrich (1981). Ägypten vor den Pyramiden – Münchner Ausgrabungen in Ägypten (in German). Mainz: Philipp von Zabern. ISBN 978-3-80-530523-5.

== Bibliography ==
- Clayton, Peter A (2006). Chronicle of the Pharaohs: The Reign-by-Reign Record of the Rulers and Dynasties of Ancient Egypt. Thames & Hudson. ISBN 0-500-28628-0.
- Edwards, IES (1965). "The Early Dynastic Period in Egypt". In Edwards, IES; et al. (eds.). The Cambridge Ancient History. Vol. 1. Cambridge University Press.

Preceded by Ka?	King of Thinis; Protodynastic	Succeeded by Narmer?
