= Ka (pharaoh) =

Predynastic pharaoh of Upper Egypt

- Sekhen
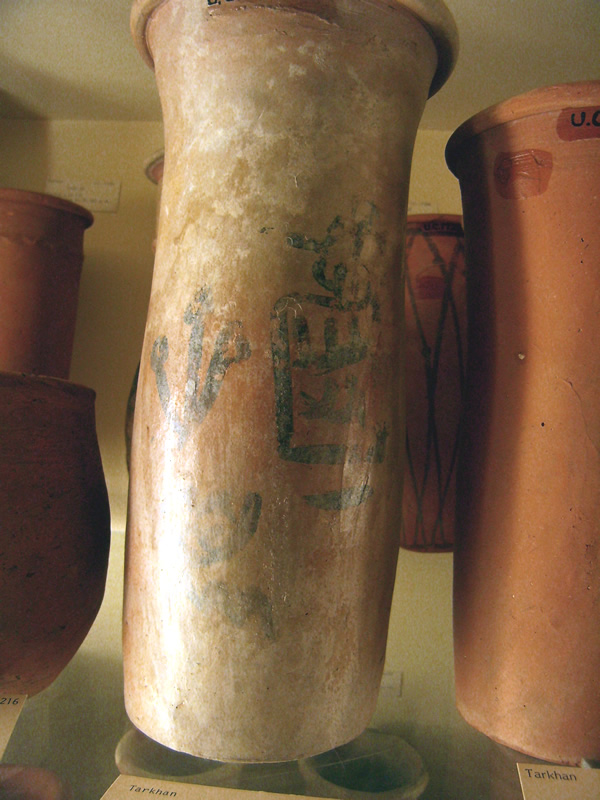
- Vessel found at Tarkhan bearing the serekh of King Ka. Petrie Museum, London

Pharaoh
- Reign: c. 3150 BC
- Predecessor: Iry-Hor
- Successor: Scorpion II?, Narmer?
Royal titulary
Horus name
Sekhen
sḫn
Embraced by Horus / He who embraces Horus
G5	D28
Alternative spellings:
G5	D32
- Consort: Ha
- Burial: Chambers B7, B9, Umm el-Qa'ab
- Dynasty: Dynasty 0

Ka, also (alternatively) Sekhen, was a Predynastic pharaoh of Upper Egypt belonging to Dynasty 0. He may have reigned c. 3150 BC. The length of his reign is unknown.

== Name ==
The correct reading of Ka's name remains uncertain. There are vessel inscriptions which show a serekh with a typical Ka-symbol, both written upright correctly, but there are also inscriptions presenting an upright serekh with an upside-down Ka-symbol inside. The second form of that writing indicates a reading as Sekhen (meaning "to embrace someone") rather than Ka. It was also thought to be the birth name of Narmer. Because the reading of the name is so uncertain, Egyptologists and writing experts such as Ludwig David Morenz prefer a neutral reading as "King Arms". Ka's personal name may have been 'king Ap.'

== Reign ==
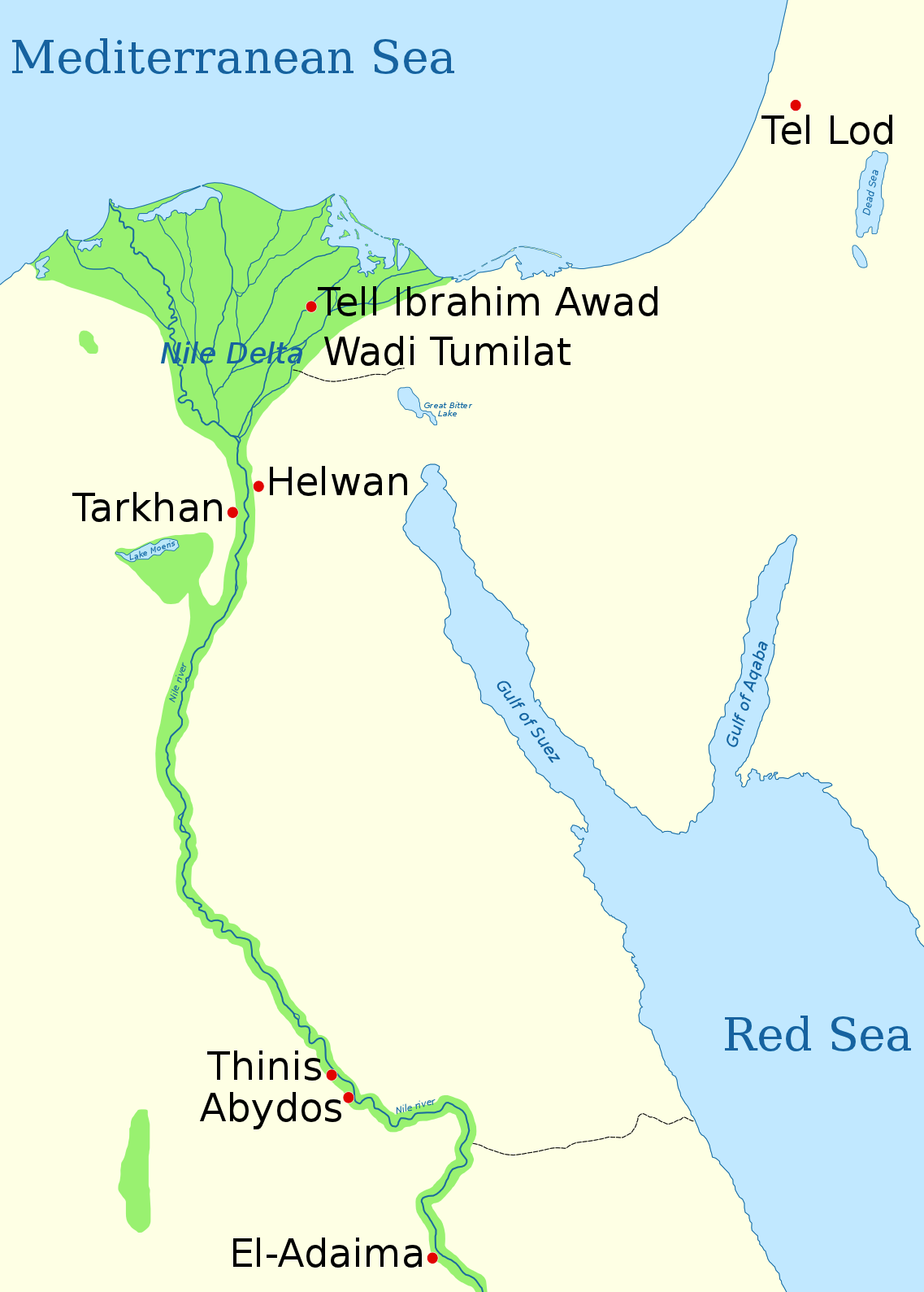
Map of the locations where Ka's serekhs have been found

Ka ruled over Thinis in the first half of the 32nd century BC and was buried at Umm el-Qa'ab. He most likely was the immediate successor to Iry-Hor and was succeeded either by Narmer or by Scorpion II. He is the earliest known Egyptian king with a serekh inscribed on a number of artifacts. This may thus be an innovation of his reign. Ka is one of the best attested predynastic kings with Narmer and Scorpion II. Beyond Abydos, he is attested in the predynastic necropolis of Adaima in Upper Egypt and in the north in Tarkhan, Helwan, Tell Ibrahim Awad, Tell el-Farkha (Eastern Nile Delta), Wadi Tumilat and as far north as Tel Lod in the Southern Levant.

The number of artifacts bearing Ka's serekh found outside Abydos is much greater than that of his predecessor. This may be the sign of an increasing influence and perhaps conquest of larger portions of Egypt by the Thinite kings.

== Tomb ==
Two underground chambers, B7 and B9, in the Umm el-Qa'ab necropolis of Abydos are believed to be part of the tomb of King Ka. Each chamber is 1.90 m deep, B.7 is 6.0 × 3.2 m while B.9 is slightly smaller at 5.9 × 3.1 m; the two chambers are 1.80 m apart.

Ka's tomb was first excavated by Flinders Petrie in 1902. The excavations yielded fragments of flint knife and pottery. In the southernmost chamber B7, more than forty inscriptions have been found on tall jars and cylinder vessels as well as a seal impression. The tomb of Ka (B7, B9) is close to that of Iry-Hor (B1, B2) and Narmer (B17, B18). Furthermore, it is located within a sequential order linking the older "U" cemetery with the First Dynasty tombs, thus suggesting that Ka succeeded Iry-Hor and preceded Narmer on the throne.

A cylinder jar found within the tomb, along with Ka's name, has inscribed the name "Ha, wife of the Horus Ka".

== Gallery ==
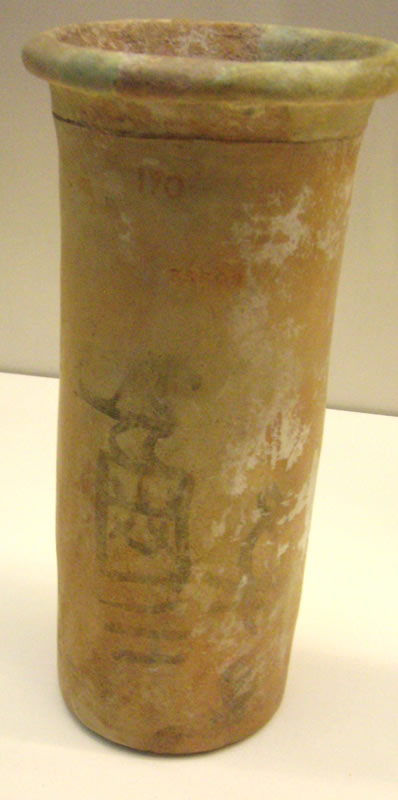
Vessel from Ka's tomb in Abydos bearing Ka's serekh on display at the British Museum

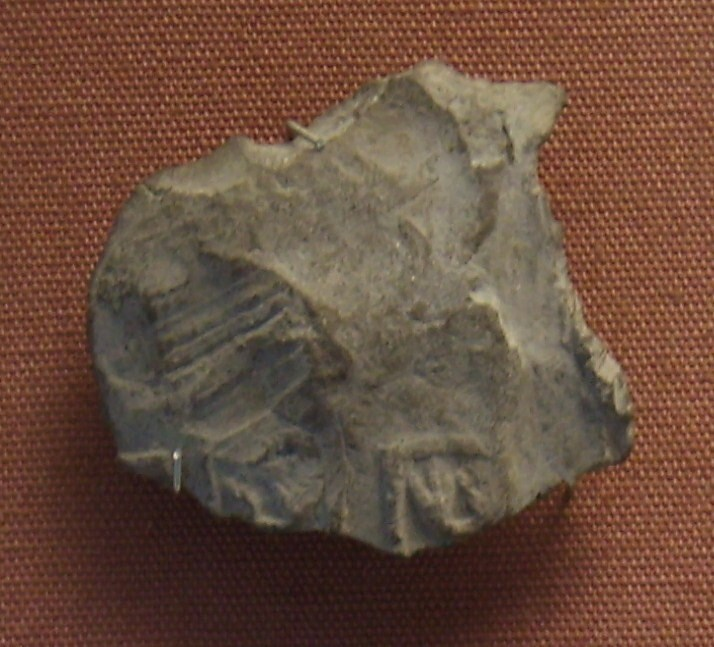
Seal impression with Ka's serekh. Note the absence of the Horus falcon. British Museum.

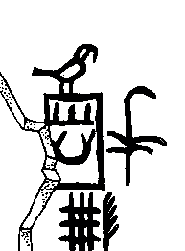
Shard bearing Ka's serekh from his tomb in Abydos

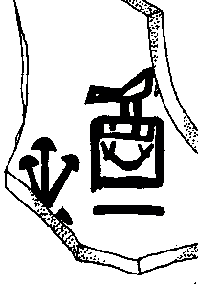
Shard bearing Ka's serekh from his tomb

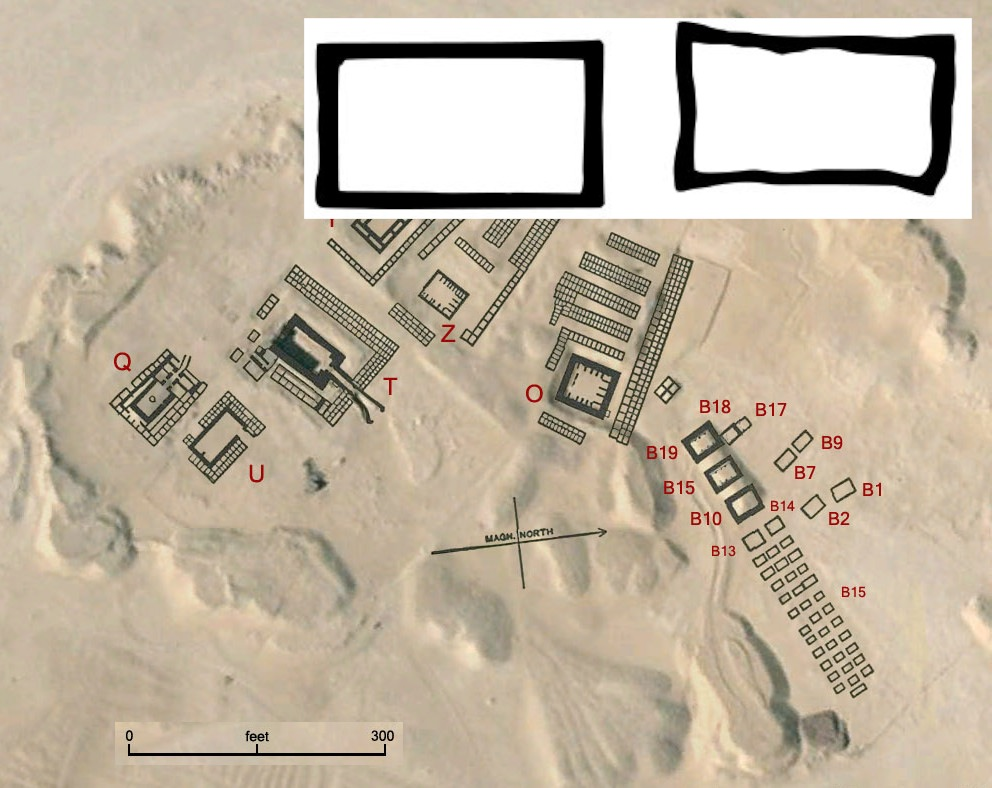
Ka's tomb in the Umm el-Qa'ab

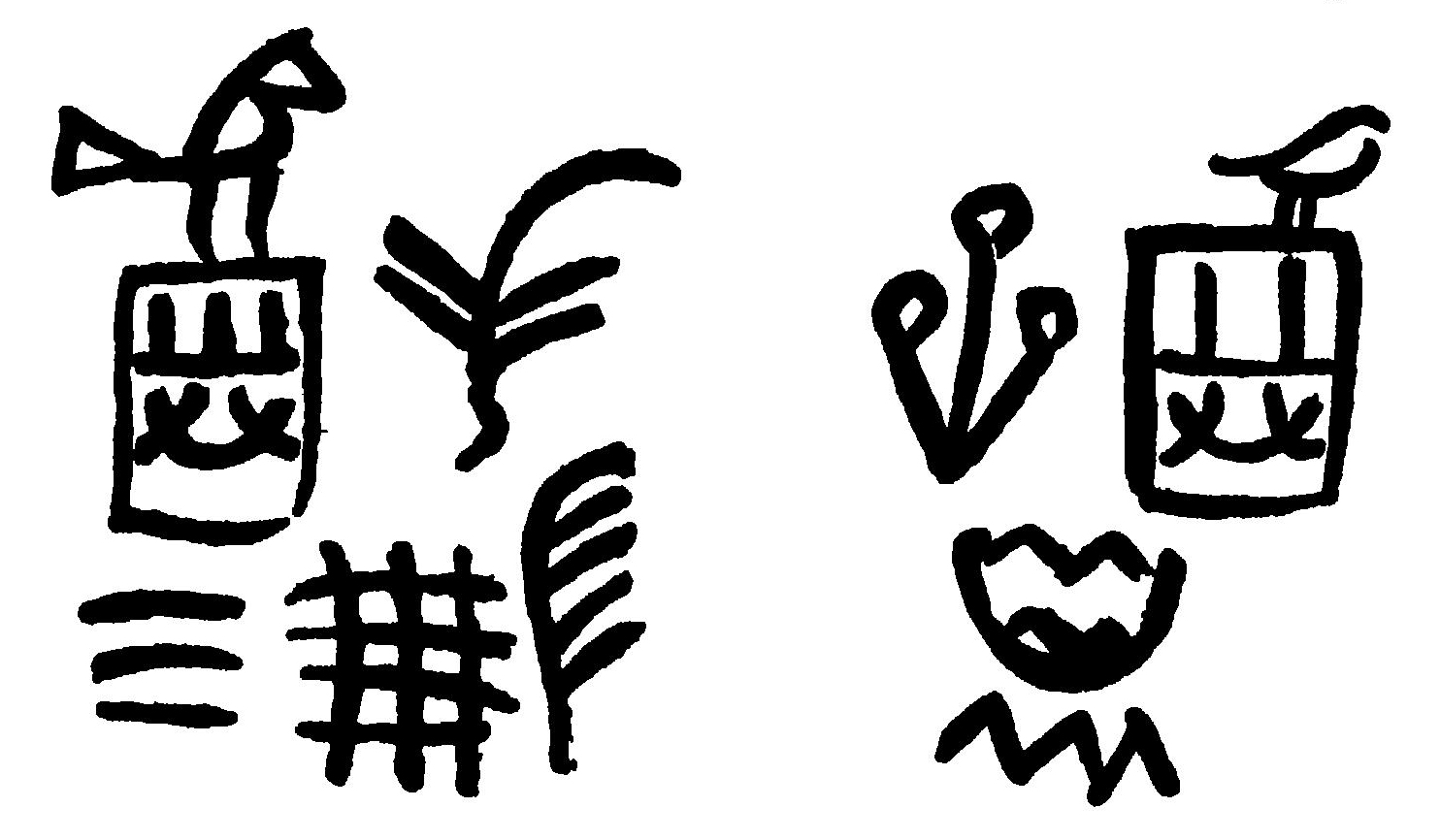
Names of Ka and Ha on a jar

== Bibliography ==
- Wilkinson, Toby AH (1999), Early Dynastic Egypt, London/New York: Routledge, ISBN 0-415-18633-1

Preceded by Iry-Hor?	King of Thinis	Succeeded by Scorpion II? Narmer?
