= Morenz =

Morenz may refer to:

- Brian Morenz (born 1949), a retired Canadian professional ice hockey player
- Howie Morenz (1902–1937), a Canadian professional ice hockey player
- Ludwig David Morenz (born 1965), German professor in Egyptology at the University of Bonn
- Shea Morenz (born 1974), a former American football and baseball player
