= D32 =

D32 or D-32 may refer to:

== Ships ==
- Brazilian destroyer Santa Catarina (D32), a Pará-class destroyer of the Brazilian Navy
- General Austria, an Almirante Clemente-class destroyer of the Venezuelan Navy
- HMS Camperdown (D32), a Battle-class destroyer of the Royal Navy
- HMS Chaser (D32), an Attacker-class escort carrier of the Royal Navy
- HMS Daring (D32), a Type 45 destroyer of the Royal Navy
- HMS Versatile (D32), a V-class destroyer of the Royal Navy

== Other uses ==
- D-32 (Michigan county highway)
- D32 road (Croatia)
- Arms-in-embrace (hieroglyph)
- LNER Class D32, a class of British steam locomotives
- Tarrasch Defense, a chess opening
- Sauter mean diameter, sometimes denoted D_{32}, D_{3,2}, or D_{[3,2]}
- CCR5-Δ32, a protein mutation that reduces chances of HIV infection
