= Tarkhan dress =

Oldest surviving piece of woven clothing

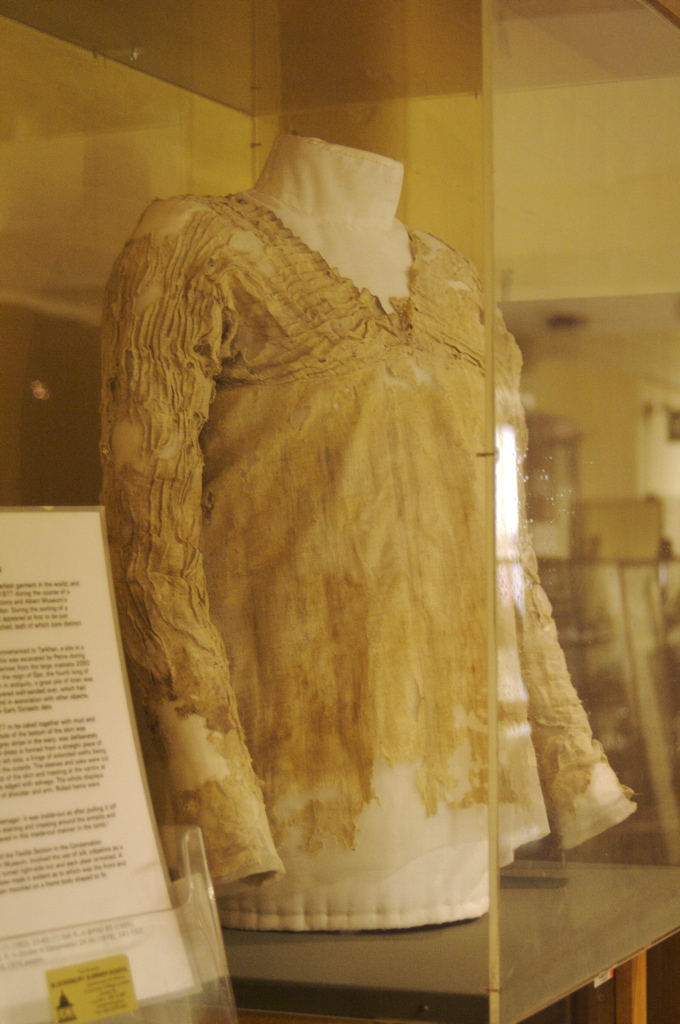
- Material: Linen
- Created: c. 3482 – 3102 BC
- Discovered: 1913; Tarkhan, Egypt
- Discovered by: Sir Flinders Petrie
- Present location: Petrie Museum of Egyptian Archaeology, London

The Tarkhan dress is a linen garment that is over 5,000 years old and the oldest surviving piece of woven clothing. It is named after Tarkhan, a necropolis south of Cairo, where it was excavated in 1913.

The dress, coded UC28614B, is currently in the collection of the Petrie Museum of Egyptian Archaeology in London. Radiocarbon dating in 1978 estimated the item to have been created around 2362 BC, though a further test in 2015 by the University of Oxford affirms, with 95% accuracy, that the dress dates from between 3482 and 3102 BC.

== Discovery ==
The Tarkhan Dress was discovered in 1913, during the second season of Flinders Petrie's excavations of the Tarkhan necropolis. During the excavation of Mastaba 2050, the dress was found alongside other linen outside of the Mastaba. It is theorised that these linens may have been thrown out later in antiquity and sanded over, which preserved the artefacts. The linen was sent to the University College London for analysis, where it lay untouched for sixty five years.

The dress was rediscovered in 1977 by conservationists at the Victoria and Albert Museum who were sorting through and cleaning "funerary rags".

== Dress ==
The Tarkhan Dress has a weave of 22–23 warps per centimetre, and 13–14 wefts per centimetre creating a grey stripe in the warp, possibly for a decorative effect. The main body of the dress was 76 centimetre wide straight piece of material. The hem of the dress is missing, leaving the original length unknown.

== See also ==
- List of individual dresses

== Bibliography ==
- Landi, Sheila; Hall, Rosalind M. (1979). "The Discovery and Conservation of an Ancient Egyptian Linen Tunic". Studies in Conservation. 24 (4): 141–152. doi:10.2307/1505776. JSTOR 1505776.
