= Tarkhan (Egypt) =

Ancient Egyptian necropolis

- Location within Egypt
- 29.500°N 31.225°E
- Type: necropolis
- Periods: Late Chalcolithic, Early Bronze Age
- Location: Egypt

History
- Built: Early 4th millennium BC

Site notes
- Excavation dates: 1911-1913, 2024
- Archaeologists: W.M. Flinders Petrie, Hilda Petrie, Anna Wodzinska
- Condition: Ruined
- Owner: Public
- Public access: Yes

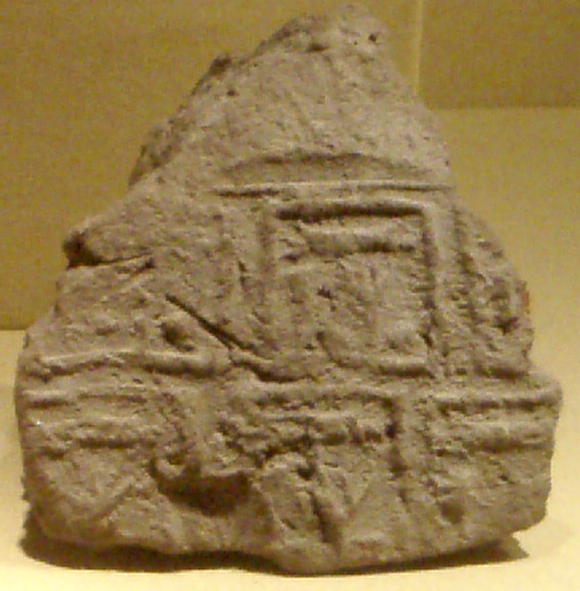
Seal impression with the name of Narmer from Tarkhan

Tarkhan (also Kafr Tarkhan) is an ancient Egyptian necropolis, located around 59 kilometers (37 mi) south of Cairo on the west bank of the Nile. The site has been degraded by the expansion of modern cemeteries and by extensive looting. The cemetery was excavated in two seasons by Flinders Petrie. Tombs of almost all periods were found, but most importantly many belonging to the time of Egyptian state formation, the Naqada IIIA2-IIIB period (c. 3300-3150 BC). Petrie found more than 2,000 tombs, most of them simple holes in the ground belonging to common people. However, there were also several mastabas of the First Dynasty, decorated with a palace facade.

The most important finds include a tomb with many seal impressions belonging to king Narmer and the Tarkhan dress, the world's oldest piece of woven clothing. The cemeteries of the later periods are called Kafr Ammar, although lying side by side with the earlier tombs. From a Roman period tomb came a Fayum mummy portrait.

== Archaeology ==
The Tarkhan necropolis consists of tombs on a series of hills (designated A thru S) running north to south for about 1.5 kilometers and also in the associated valley (wadi). About 1300 graves were found on the hills and about 1100 in the valley. It was used heavily in the late 4th millennium BC and early 3rd millennium BC and then intermittently until the Roman period. Excavation in the valley was limited on the east by ground water and the excavator estimated the actual necropolis was two or three time larger than that excavated.

The site was excavated "responding to reports of looting by local villagers" under the auspices of the British School of Archaeology in Egypt between 1911 and 1913 by W.M. Flinders Petrie, working with his wife Hilda Petrie and Gerald Avery Wainwright. T. E. Lawrence was a worker at the site in the first season of work. It is estimated that at least two thirds of the tombs have been looted at some point. About 2000 Naqada IIIA period to the end of the First Dynasty tombs were excavated. Fourteen bovine graves were also excavated. Finds included a total of 282 First Dynasty potmarks. Six cylindrical pottery jars (diagnostic of the Naqada III) with inscribed post-fired inked serekh symbols were found. One (UC16072) was ascribed to ruler Ka, one to Narmer (UC17291, not published and whereabouts unknown), two (UC16071 and UC16947) have been proposed as being of ruler Crocodile, one (UC 16086) is in dispute. The last (UC16085) has been ascribed to Narmer, Aha, and Djer though consensus has settled on Aha (Hor-Aha). Many of the finds were sent to various museums with the Petrie Museum of Egyptian Archaeology being the primary destination. Half of the pottery, palettes and stone vessels went to the Cairo Museum where they were placed in the sale room and lost to science.

In 2024, in response to extensive looting, a University of Warsaw team led by Anna Wodzinska, under the auspices of the Egyptian Ministry of Tourism and Antiquities, began work at the site. Using satellite imagery a new geo-referenced map of the site, aligned with the original excavation plans of Petrie, was developed. Magnetic prospection using a fluxgate gradiometer was conducted over a 2.5 hectare area of the site. Three masatabas recorded by Petrie were confirmed. A surface survey was then conducted at the site. Heavy looting was noted. Surface finds came from the Late Predynastic, Early Dynastic, Old Kingdom, and Late Period.

=== Mastaba 2050 ===
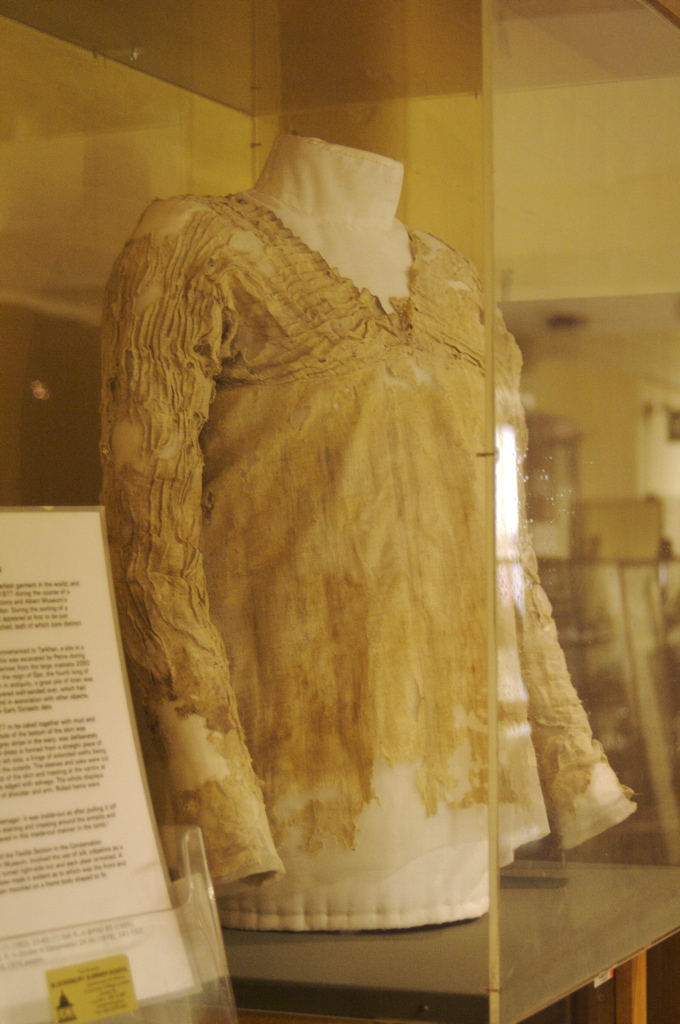
Tarkhan Dress

In the previously looted tomb Petrie found a "great pile of linen cloth". The tomb contained Naqada IIIC1 type stone vessels. Conservation of the linen in 1977 revealed the Tarkhan dress. Originally, using conventional radiocarbon dating, it was dated to the late 3rd millennium BC. More recent AMS radiocarbon dating, on a very small sample, found a value of 4570±36 BP (calibration method not stated) which corresponds to a date of 3482–3102 BC, late 4th millennium BC.

=== Tomb 412 ===
Looted and superstructure lost (though thought to have had a mastaba because of the large open area around it). The mud plastered tomb chamber is sizable at 1.54 meters by 3.18 meters by 1.53 meters in depth, one of the largest at the site. The body was male and oriented to the South. Pottery dated the tomb to the Naqada IIIC1 period. Finds included two copper adzes, a copper bowl, and a small ivory/bone object marking this as a high status burial. One cylindrical pottery jar (UC 16086) had an ink inscription for which the reading is disputed with proposals ranging across the name of a king (possibly Ka), a tax stamp, and a product mark.

=== Tomb 414 ===
Adjacent to Tomb 412 and also thought to have had a mastaba. Its construction is similar to Tomb 412 though it is brick lined. The tomb chamber was 1.67 meters by 3.55 meters by 1.8 meters in depth. The tomb contained a number of seal impression of ruler Narmer as well as a cylindrical pottery jar inscribed with that name. A cylinder seal was found in the tomb showing "the crocodile Sobek with two plumages on its back standing above a stand which is surrounded by other representations of crocodiles and coiled ropes".

=== Tomb 1060 (palace facade tomb) ===
Tomb 1060 was a mastaba constructed of "crude" mud bricks on a low mud brick platform surrounded by a wall. It measured 34.04 meters by 15.62 meters for an area of about 539 square meters with an exterior palace facade with niches (about 9 on the long sides and about 4 on the short sides). It was originally covered with white plaster and traces of red paint remain. The area of the platform is unknown due to the edges being lost. There were 14 rooms on the level above the underground burial chamber, one above the chamber, 9 around that room, 1 at one short end, and 3 more at the other short end. The burial chamber itself had 2 false doors (painted red) on the north and on the south walls and had 4 side rooms (filled with sand) and all walls were white plastered.

== Gallery ==
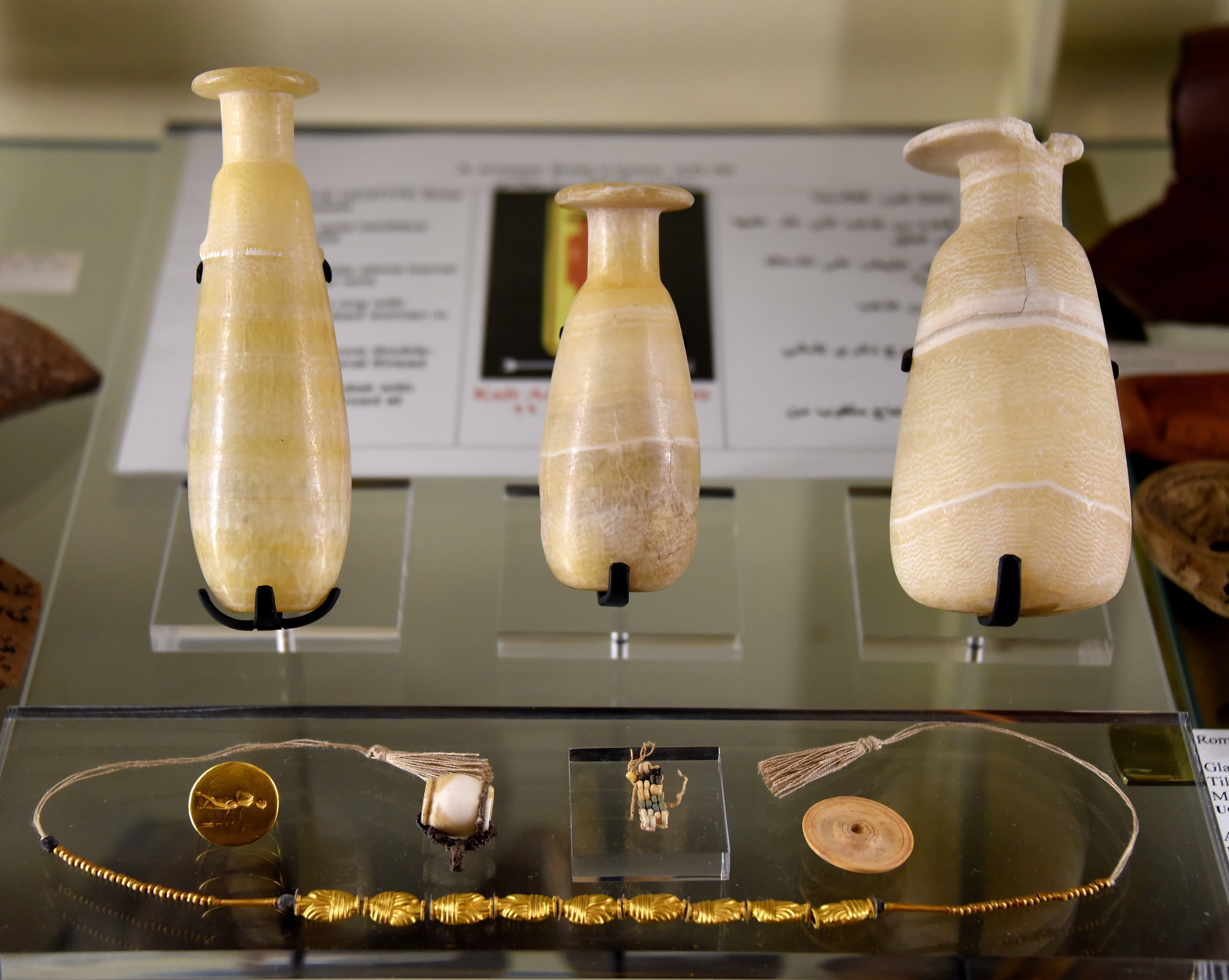
Contents of tomb 99. 1st century CE. From tomb 99 at Tarkhan, Egypt. Petrie Museum, London

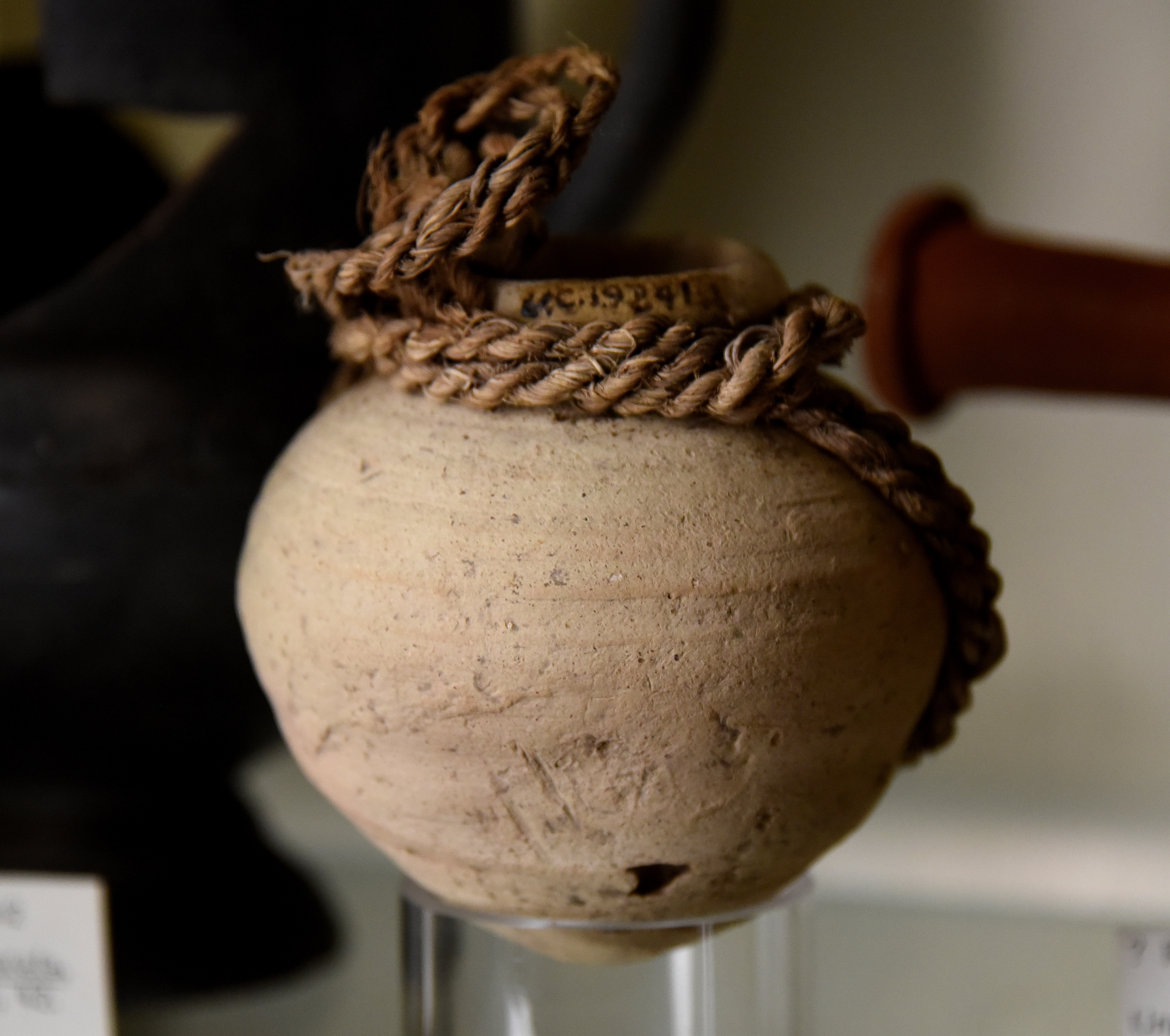
Pottery jar, drab ware. The original loop slip is still present. Ptolemaic period. From Tarkhan, Egypt. Petrie Museum, London

== See also ==
- List of ancient Egyptian sites, including sites of temples
