= Alice Stevenson =

British archaeologist and curator

Alice Stevenson FSA
- Occupations: Curator, archaeologist

Academic background
- Education: University of Cambridge

Alice Stevenson FSA is a British archaeologist and museum curator. She is Professor of Museum Archaeology at UCL's Institute of Archaeology and a specialist in Predynastic and Early Dynastic Egyptian archaeology.

== Education ==
Stevenson completed her bachelor's degree in Archaeology and Anthropology from the University of Cambridge in 1998 and followed this with a master's degree in museum studies at the University of Leicester, completed in 2001. She went on to gain a PhD in archaeology from the University of Cambridge in 2006 with a thesis titled The Predynastic Egyptian Cemetery of el-Gerzeh. Mortuary Rituals and Social Identities. She became a Fellow of the Higher Education Academy in 2014.

== Career ==
Stevenson was Research Fellow at the UCL Institute of Archaeology in 2010. From 2009 to 2012 she worked as a Researcher in World Archaeology at the Pitt Rivers Museum. During her time there, she co-edited a book characterising the nature and research potential of the museum's collections celebrating one hundred years of public access to the collections in 2015.

Stevenson was Curator of the Petrie Museum of Egyptian Archaeology from 2013 to 2016 and published an edited volume about the museum titled The Petrie Museum of Egyptian Archaeology: Characters and Collections in 2015. During her time at the museum, a garment in the museum collection was radiocarbon dated to between 3482 and 3102 BC, and heralded as the world's oldest dress.

Stevenson is a contributor to The Conversation news outlet and has written an article about the sale of archaeological antiquities on the open market.

She was elected as a Fellow of the Society of Antiquaries of London on 12 December 2019.

== Selected publications ==
- Mairs, R., Stevenson, A. (2007). Current Research in Egyptology: 2005 Proceedings of the Sixth Annual Symposium which Took Place at the University of Cambridge, 6–8 January 2005. Oxbow Books Limited.
- Stevenson, A. E. (2009). The Predynastic Egyptian Cemetery of el-Gerzeh. Social Identities and Mortuary Practices. Leuven: Peeters.
- Hicks, D., Stevenson, A. E. (Eds.), (2013). World Archaeology at the Pitt Rivers Museum: A Characterization. Oxford: Archaeopress.
- Stevenson, A. E. (2015). The Petrie Museum of Egyptian Archaeology: Characters and Collections. London: UCL Press.
- Stevenson, A., Libonati, E., Williams, A. (2016). 'A selection of minor antiquities': a multi-sited view on collections from excavations in Egypt. World Archaeology, 48 (2), 282–295. doi:10.1080/00438243.2016.1165627
- Stevenson, A. E., Libonati, E., Baines, J. (2017). 'Introduction—object habits: Legacies of fieldwork and the museum'. Museum History Journal, 10 (2), doi:10.1080/19369816.2017.1328780
