= Arms-in-embrace (hieroglyph) =

Egyptian hieroglyph

D32 D31
Arms-in-Embrace
in hieroglyphs

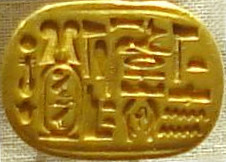
Ring honoring Khufu, (Cheops), Ptolemaic Period.

The ancient Egyptian Arms-in-embrace hieroglyph, Gardiner sign listed no. D32 is a portrayal of the embracing human arms. The hieroglyph is in the large Gardiner sign list category of Parts of the Human Body.

Multiple types of additional hieroglyphs are inserted between the arms, forming Gardiner unlisted varieties.

== Usage ==
The Egyptian language arms-in-embrace hieroglyph has multiple uses. It is a determinative for 'hugging', inq, "to surround", and ḥpt, "to hug".

As an ideogram it has two meanings for s(kh)n. Both uses are verb uses. 'Sekhen-1', with multiple spellings, and various secondary determinatives, O34 Aa1 N35 D32 G43 O34 Aa1 W24 D32 W24 (sḫn), meaning: to fold in the arms, to embrace, to contain, to hold. The second meaning, (sḫn), spellings of, D32 W24 Aa29 D32 W24 O34 Aa1 N35 D32 W24 is used to mean: to happen, a happening, event, occurrence. (verb or noun).

=== Rosetta Stone, Egyptian hieroglyph section text ===
In the 196 BC Rosetta Stone, a "(May there be): Good Forture"-(i.e. "Good Luck") phrase is a segue to the 8 listed rewards given to the honoring of Ptolemy V, one, by erecting his Decree of Memphis (Ptolemy V) in the temple courtyard. The phrase is three-part: ḥ'–s(kh)n–nfr, "And a happening good ! – [may there be]. V28 D36 D32 W24 Aa29 F35

Preceded by Y8 O34 Aa1 Aa15 Y8; Sistrum -- -- s(kh)m	D32 arms-in-embrace -- -- s(kh)n	Succeeded by O30 support -- -- s(kh)n-t

== Gallery ==
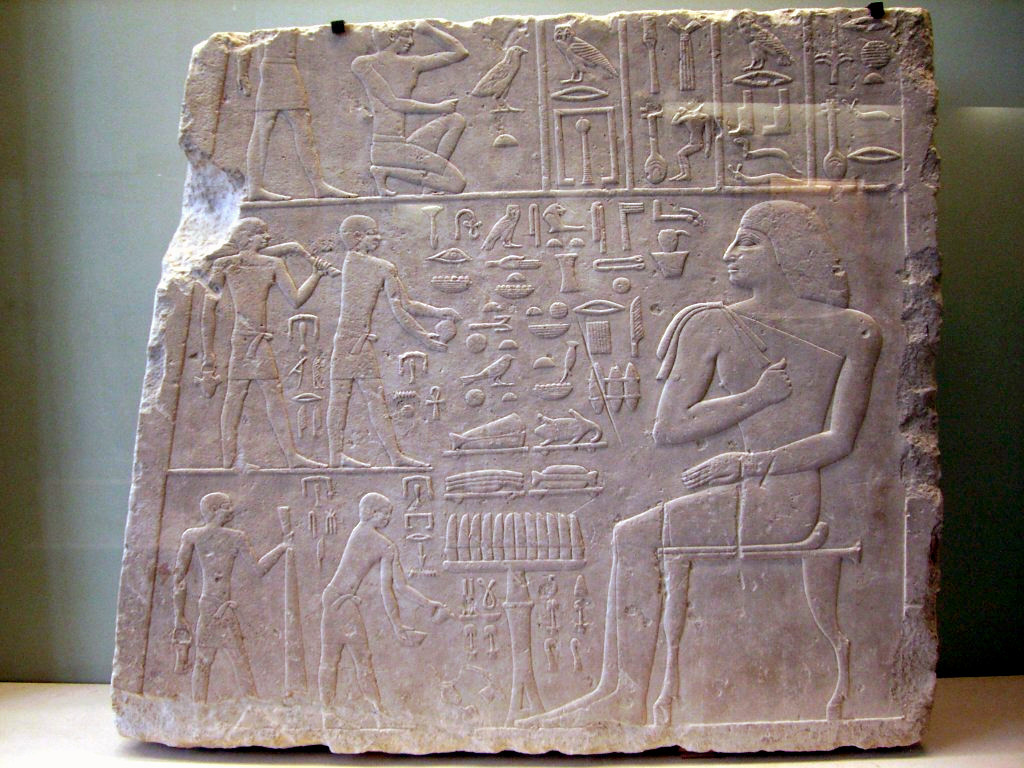
Slab stela, multiple use of the "arms-in-embrace" for supplying provisions for the Afterlife

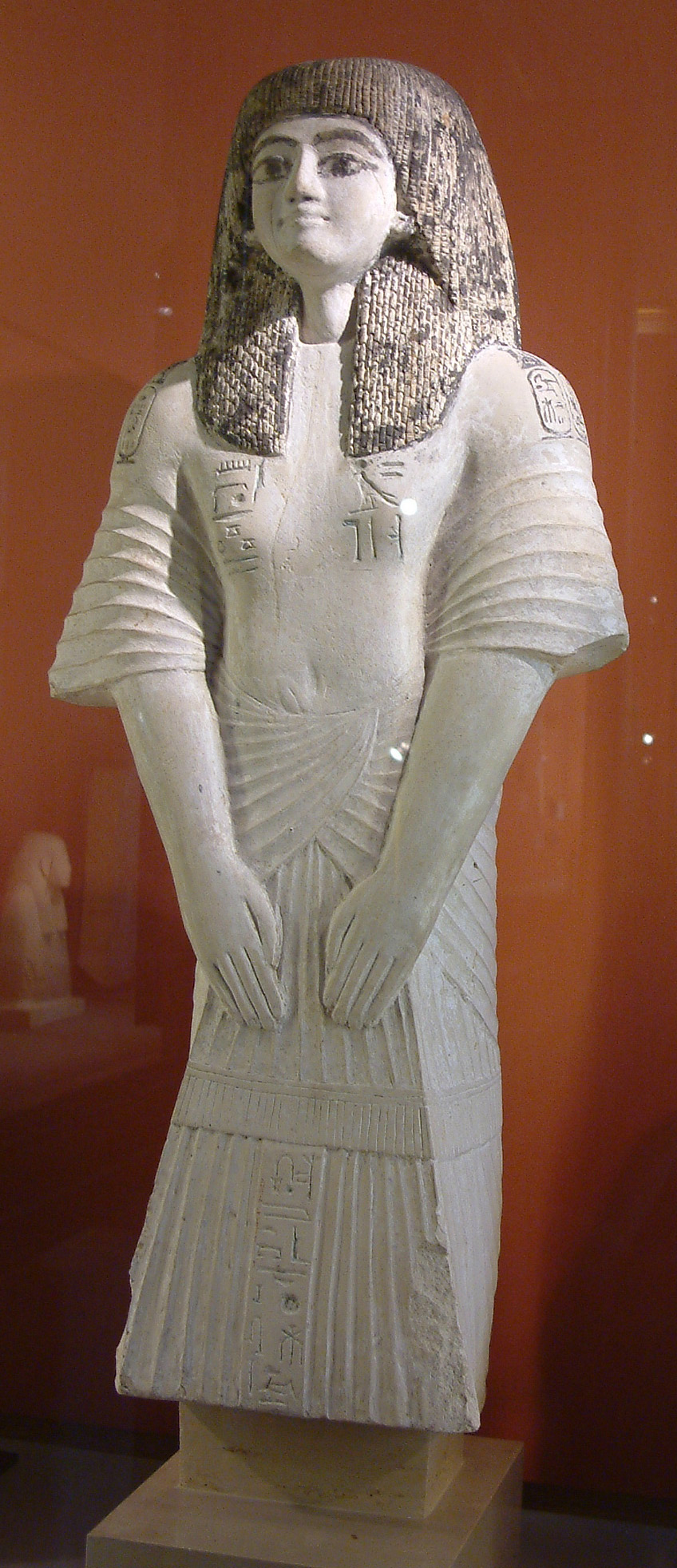
Statuary use of the hieroglyph

== See also ==
- Gardiner's Sign List#O. Parts of the Human Body
- List of Egyptian hieroglyphs
