= Petrie Museum of Egyptian Archaeology =

Museum in London, England

Petrie Museum of Egyptian and Sudanese Archaeology
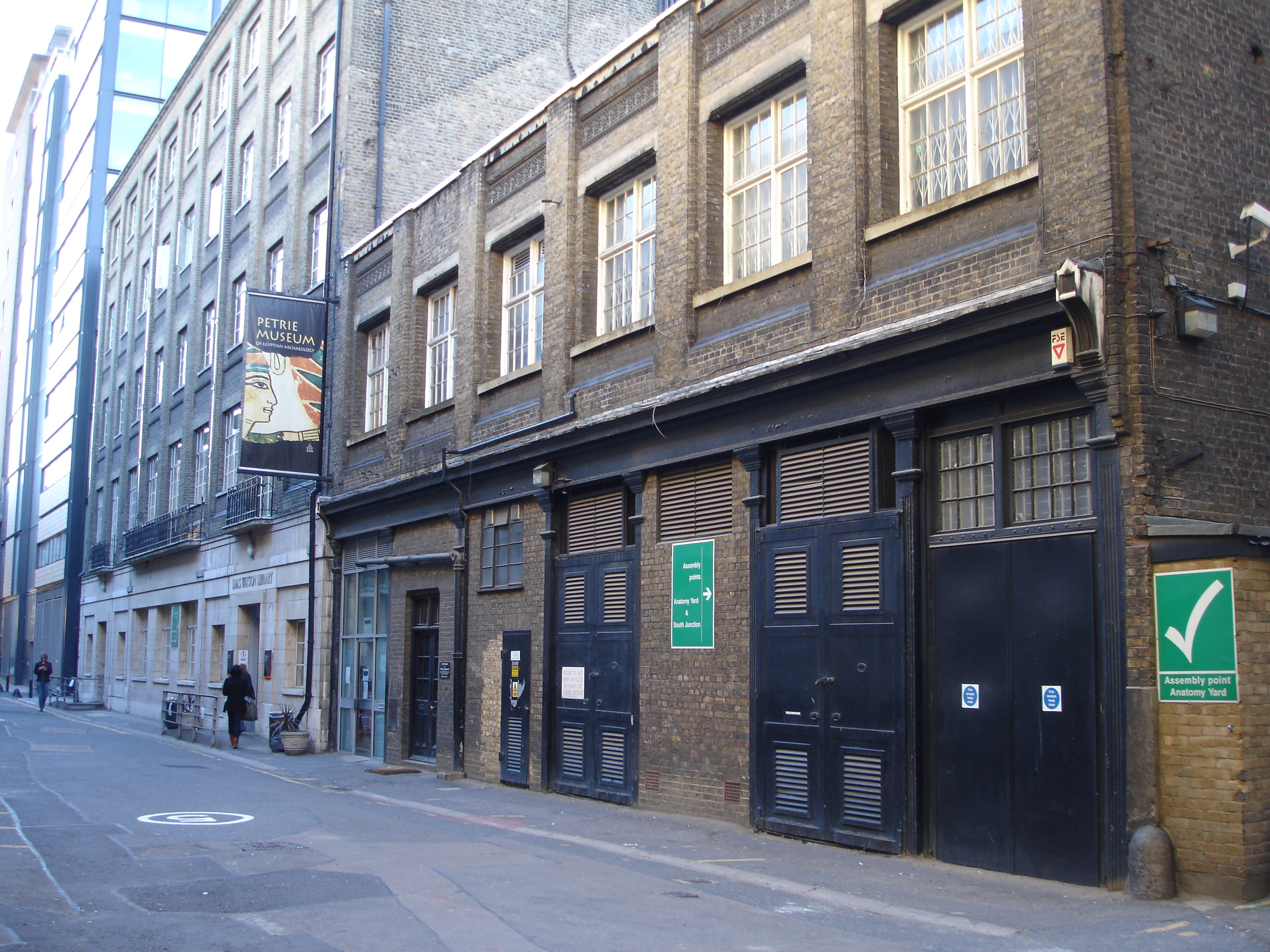
- The Petrie Museum of Egyptian and Sudanese Archaeology
- Established: 1892
- Location: London
- Coordinates: 51°31′25″N 0°7′59″W
- Collection size: Over 80,000 objects
- Website: Official website

The Petrie Museum of Egyptian and Sudanese Archaeology in London is part of University College London Museums and Collections. The museum contains over 80,000 objects, making it one of the world's largest collections of Egyptian and Sudanese material. It is designated under the Arts Council England Designation Scheme as being of "national and international importance".

== History ==
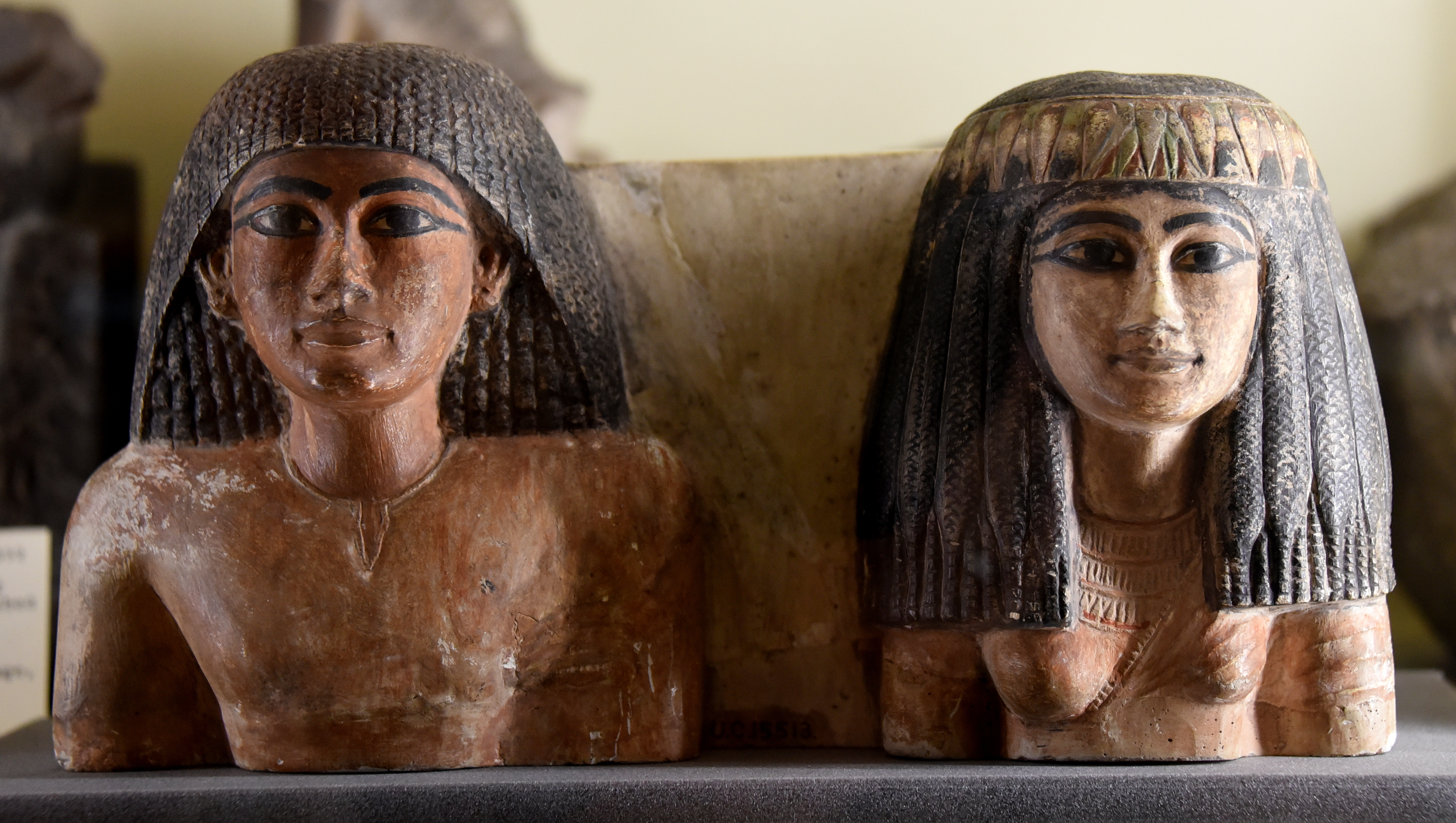
Upper part of a statuette of an Egyptian woman and her husband. 18th Dynasty. From the Amelia Edwards Collection now housed in the Petrie Museum

The museum was established as a teaching resource for the Department of Egyptian Archaeology and Philology at University College at the same time as the department was established in 1892. The initial collection was donated by the writer Amelia Edwards. The first Edwards Professor, William Matthew Flinders Petrie, conducted many important excavations, and in 1913 he sold his collections of Egyptian antiquities to University College, creating the Flinders Petrie Collection of Egyptian Antiquities, and transforming the museum into one of the leading collections outside Egypt. The collection was first put on display in June 1915. Petrie excavated dozens of major sites in the course of his career, including the Roman Period cemeteries at Hawara, famous for the beautiful mummy portraits in classical Roman style; Amarna, the city of king Akhenaten; and the first true pyramid, at Meydum, where he uncovered some of the earliest evidence for mummification.

The collection and library were arranged in galleries within the main building at the university and a guidebook was published in 1915. Initially, the collection's visitors were students and academics; it was not then open to the general public. Petrie retired from University College London (UCL) in 1933, though his successors continued to add to the collections, excavating in other parts of Egypt and Sudan. During the Second World War (1939–1945) the collection was packed up and moved out of London for safekeeping. In the early 1950s it was moved into a former stable, where it remains adjacent to the UCL Science Library, DMS Watson Building.

== Current description ==
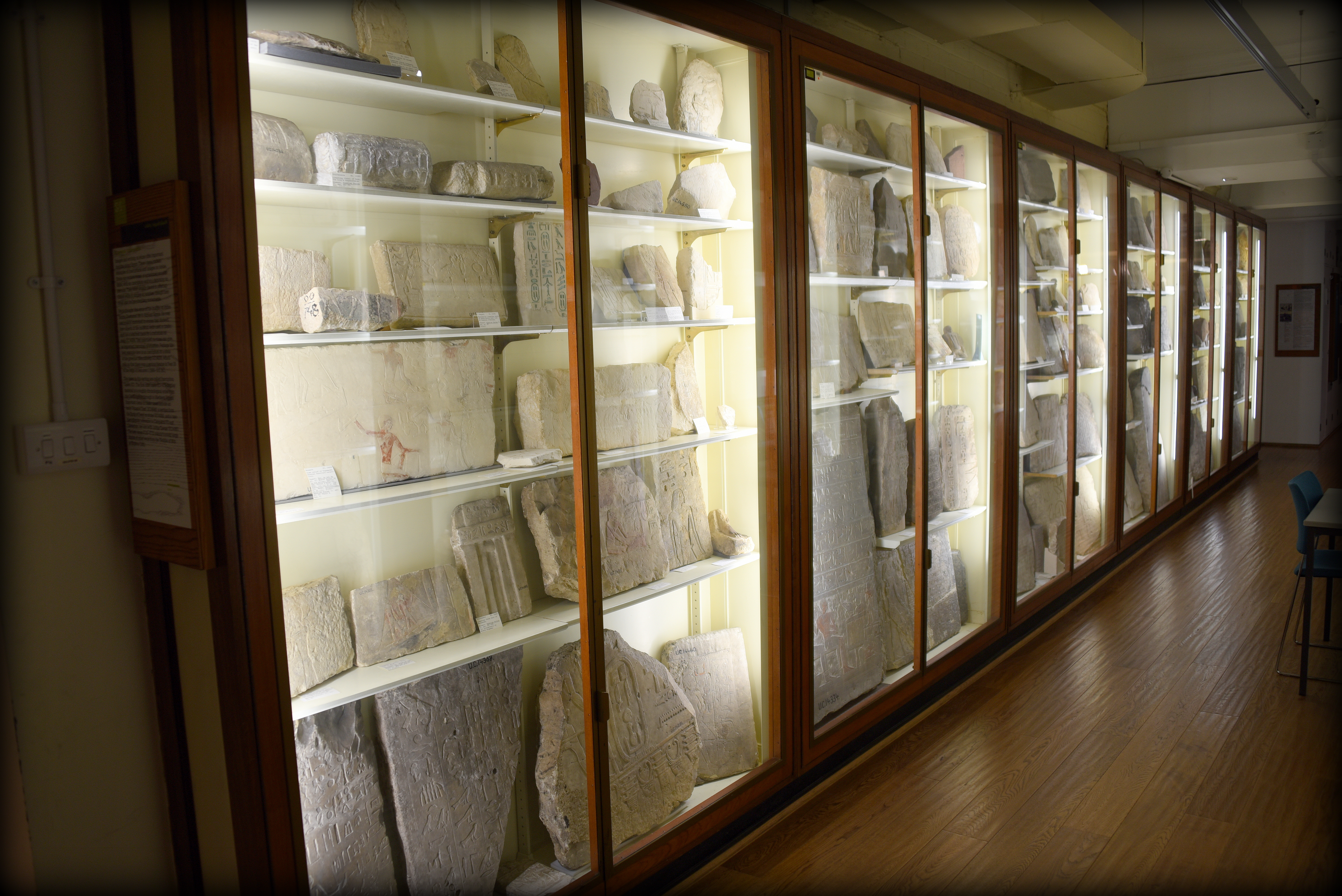
Fragments and slabs of stelae. Inscriptions Aisle

The museum is at Malet Place, near Gower Street and the University College London science library. Admission is free. The museum has an exhibitions and events programme for adults and families. There is a Friends of the Petrie Museum charity that supports the museum.

=== Organisation and collections ===
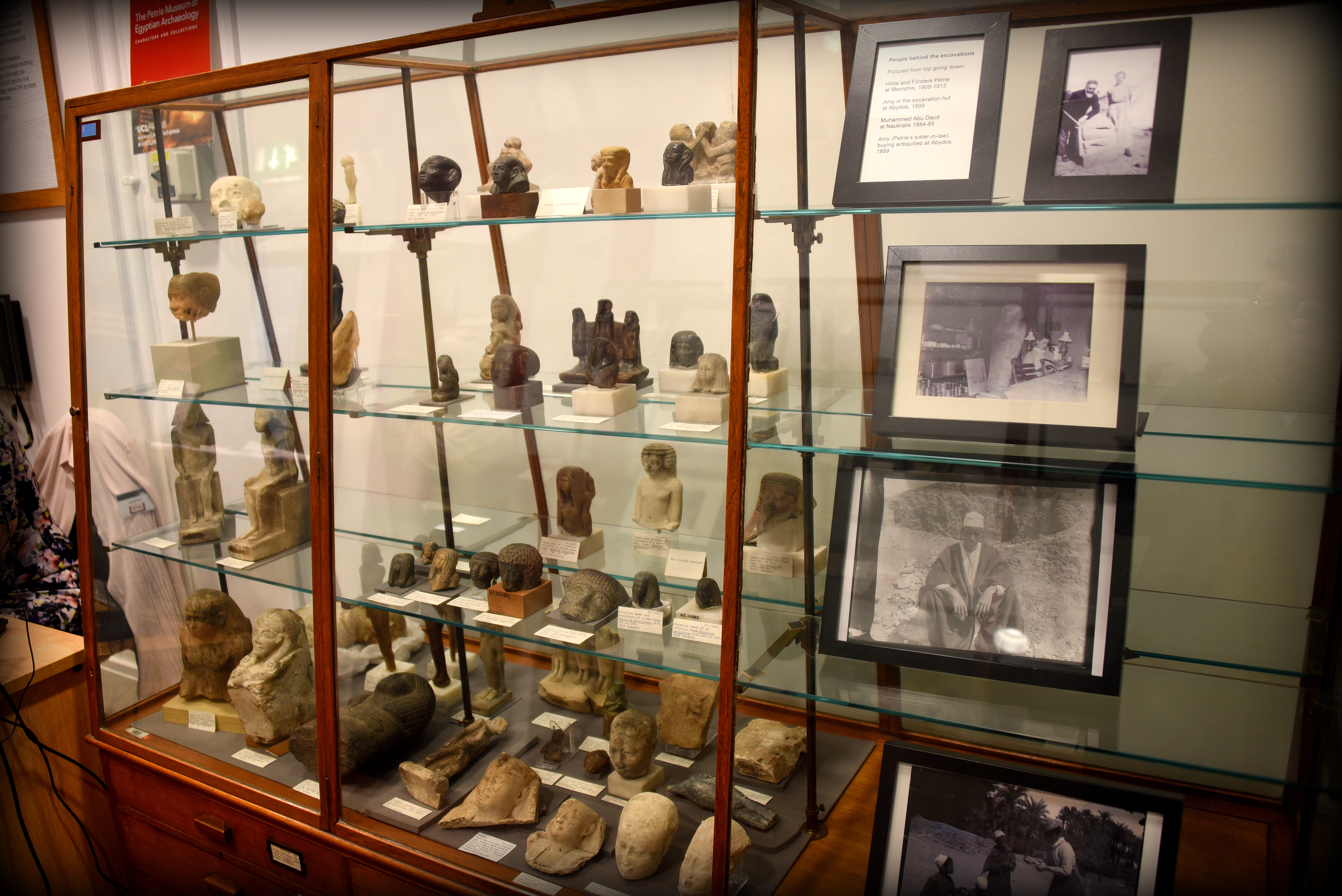
Display case at previous entrance to the Petrie (prior to refurbishment), with figurines and statuettes

The museum's entrance gallery was renovated in 2019 and reopened to the public in 2020. It provides an insight into the history of the museum, its collections, and notable figures, including Petrie, Amelia Edwards, Ali Suefi, and Violette Lafleur. The entrance also contains a small gift shop.

The museum is split into three galleries. The main gallery (housed above the old stables) contains many of the museum's small domestic artefacts, mummy portraits and cases, and the Inscriptions Aisle. The Inscriptions Aisle displays tablets, including Pyramid Texts, written in hieroglyphics, hieratic, Greek, and Arabic, and organised according to material type. Another gallery (the pottery gallery) contains many cabinets of pottery, clothing, jewellery, and shabti figures, arranged chronologically.

The entire collection has been digitised and the catalogue can be browsed and consulted online.

=== Significant holdings ===
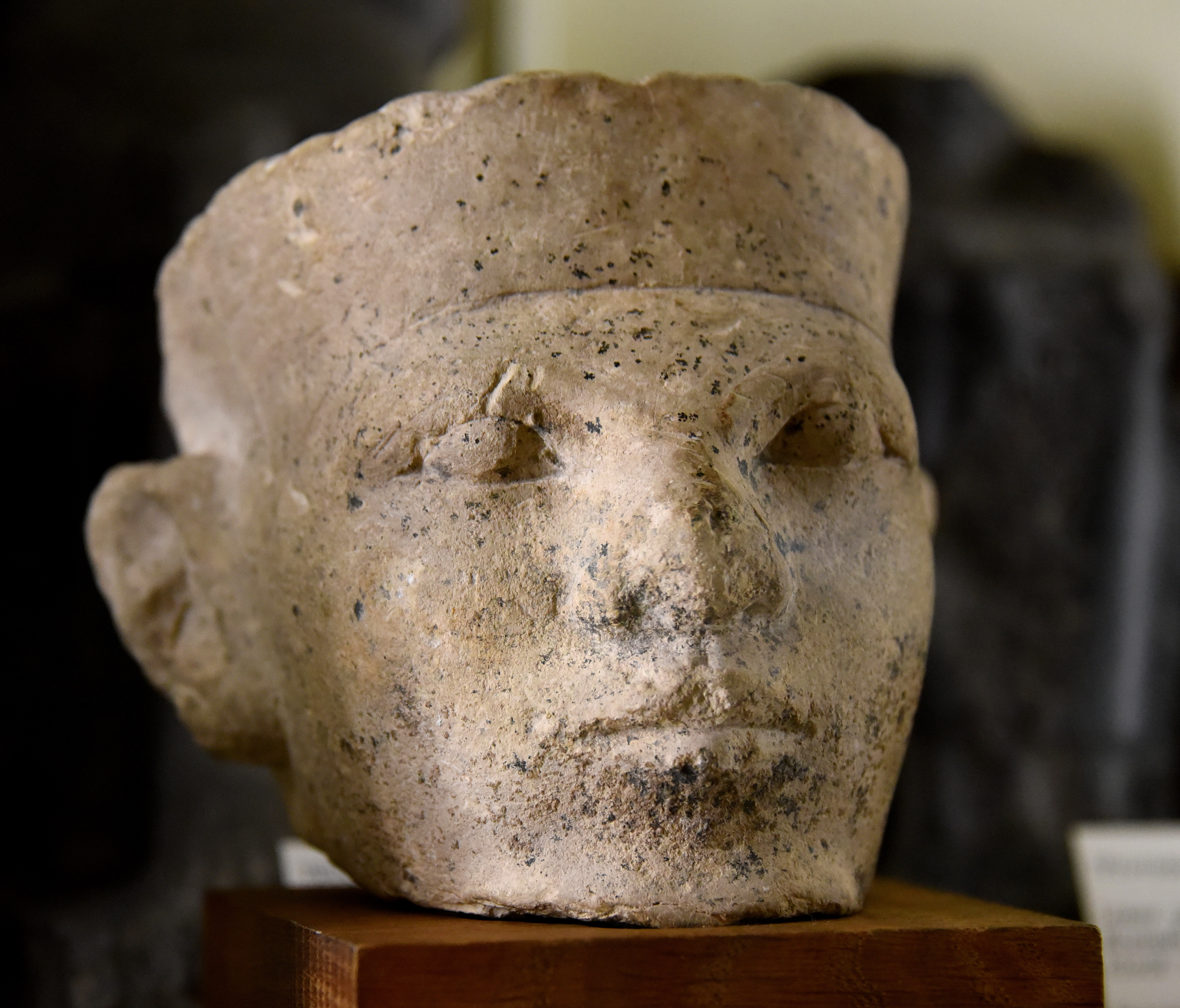
Limestone head of a king. Thought by Petrie to be Narmer, based on the similarity to the head of Narmer on the Narmer Palette. According to Trope, Quirke & Lacovara, the suggestion that it is Narmer is "unlikely". Alternatively, they suggest the Fourth Dynasty king Khufu. Stevenson also identifies it as Khufu. Charron identifies it as a king of the Thinite Period, but does not believe it can be assigned to any particular king. Wilkinson describes it as "probably Second Dynasty".

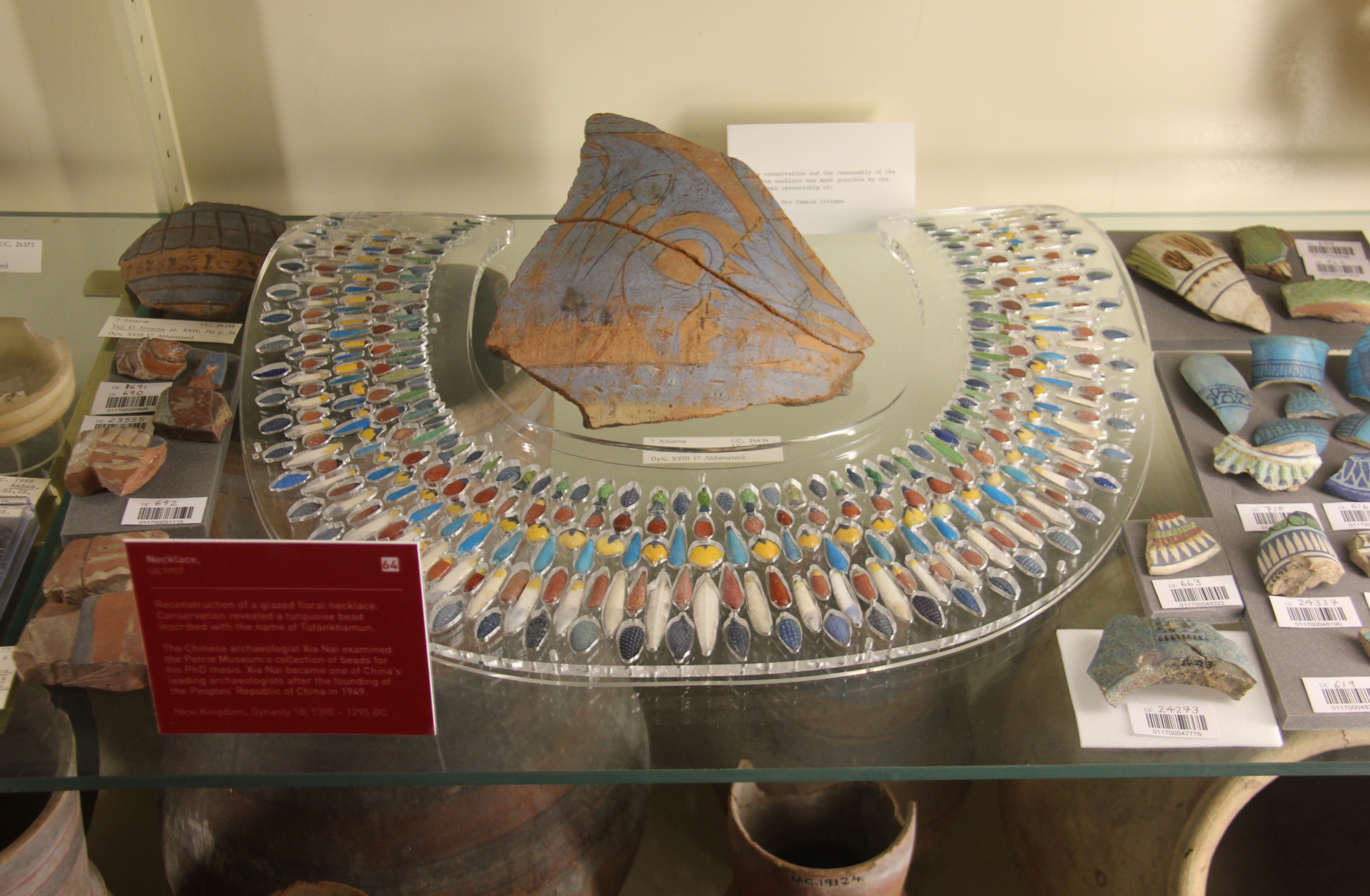
This is a reconstructed glazed floral necklace with 8 rows of beads now in the Petrie Museum of London, Britain. It bears the cartouche of Tutankhamun.

The museum contains over 80,000 objects and has been designated as a collection of national and international importance by the Arts Council England.

There are significant holdings of Egyptian costume, including a piece of Egyptian linen from around 5000 BC, one of the earliest known, and the Tarkhan dress from the fourth millennium BC, the world's oldest known woven garment as of 2016.

The collection also includes material from the Ptolemaic, Roman and Islamic periods. This includes Britain's largest collection of Roman period mummy portraits.

There is a substantial archive held in the museum, including excavation records, correspondence and photographs relating to excavations led by Flinders Petrie. There are additionally documents relating to the distribution of finds from fieldwork to museums worldwide between 1887 and 1949.

== List of curators ==
- 1948–1963: Anthony J. Arkell
- 1963–1970: Harry Smith
- 1970–1978: David M. Dixon
- 1984–2001: Barbara Adams
- 1999-2013: Stephen Quirke
- 2013–2016: Alice Stevenson
- 2017–present: Anna E. Garnett

== Published works ==
In 2007 Left Coast Press published Living Images: Egyptian Funerary Portraits in the Petrie Museum, edited by Janet Picton, Stephen Quirke, and Paul C. Roberts. This book is on the Roman mummy portraits from the Fayum and details their conservation work.

In 2014 Bloomsbury Press published Archaeology of Race which "explores the application of racial theory to interpret the past in Britain during the late Victorian and Edwardian period." The book, written by Debbie Chalice, specifically focuses on how Flinders Petrie applied the ideas of Francis Galton on inheritance and race to the discipline of archaeology.

In 2015 UCL Press published a multi-author compilation of articles, The Petrie Museum of Egyptian Archaeology: Characters and Collections, which is available in both print and via a free open access download. It is edited by Alice Stevenson.

== See also ==
- List of museums of Egyptian antiquities

== Bibliography ==
- Charron, Alain (1990), "L'époque thinite", L'Égypte des millénaires obscures, Paris, pp. 77–97.
- Petrie, W.M. Flinders (1939), The making of Egypt, British School of Archaeology in Egypt and Egyptian Research Account, vol. 61, London: Sheldon Press.
- Stevenson, Alice (2015). The Petrie Museum of Egyptian Archaeology: Characters and Collections. London: UCLPress. ISBN 978-1-910634-04-2.

Open access pdf download.

- Trope, Betsy Teasley; Quirke, Stephen; Lacovara, Peter (2005), Excavating Egypt: great discoveries from the Petrie Museum of Egyptian Archaeology, University College, London, Atlanta: Michael C. Carlos Museum, Emory University.
- Wilkinson, TAH (1999), Early Dynastic Egypt, London; New York: Routledge.
