= Ludwig David Morenz =

German Egyptologist (born 1965)

Ludwig David Morenz (born 4 April 1965) is a German professor in Egyptology at the University of Bonn. He received his Ph.D. from the University of Leipzig and Habilitation from the University of Tübingen. His fields of research include the origins of Egyptian writing, Ancient Egyptian literature, ancient Egyptian society, and Renaissance and Baroque-era European studies on ancient Egypt. His current focus of research is exploring various levels of economic dependencies of Cannanites in relation to Egypt, that is not limited to slaves or illiterate workforce.

== Education ==
In 1985, he got a Diploma in Oriental Archeology at the Martin-Luther-Universität Halle-Wittenberg. In 1990, he received his Ph.D. at the University of Leipzig in Egyptology and Coptology.

== Career ==
In 2002, he received a Heisenberg scholarship of the DFG (German Research Foundation). In 2005, he got Herzog Ernst Fellowship at the Gotha Research Library, where he worked on Case Study on the Egyptian Reception. In 2006, he was a guest Scientist at Uppsala Universitet. In 2006 - 2007, he was a Senior Fellow at the International Research Center for Cultural Studies in Vienna. In 2009, he got a position as a professor of Egyptology at the University of Bonn.

== International Conferences ==
- "The Alpha and the Omega of Sinuhe. Reinterpretating a Classical Middle Egyptian Text", with H. Hays and F. Feder at Universiteit Leiden, 2009.
- Member of the International Organizing Committee of the Xth International Congress of Egyptians in Rhodes, 2008.
- "Preface or formative phase. Egypt and the Near East 3500 - 2700 BC" at Universität Leipzig, 2007.
- "Text and Image. Trans- and intermediality from Egyptological, Ancient Near Eastern and Old Testament perspectives", with S. Schorch, Bethel / Bielefeld, 2007.
- "What is a text? Egyptological, Ancient Near Eastern and Old Testament Perspectives", with S. Schorch, Bethel / Bielefeld, 2005.
- "Exotic, Wisdom and Ancient. European Constructions of Ancient Egypt", with T. Glück at Universität Leipzig, 2004.

== Books ==
- "The Time of the Regions in the Mirror of the Gebelein Region: Cultural-Historical Re-Constructions (Problems of A) (Problems of Egyptology)", 2010.
- "Meaning and Mystery of the Signs: Visual Poetry in Ancient Egypt", 2008.
- "Menschen und Götter. Buchstaben und Bilder"

== See also ==
- List of Egyptologists
