= Naqada III =

Last phase of the Naqada culture of ancient Egyptian prehistory

Semainian culture / Naqada III
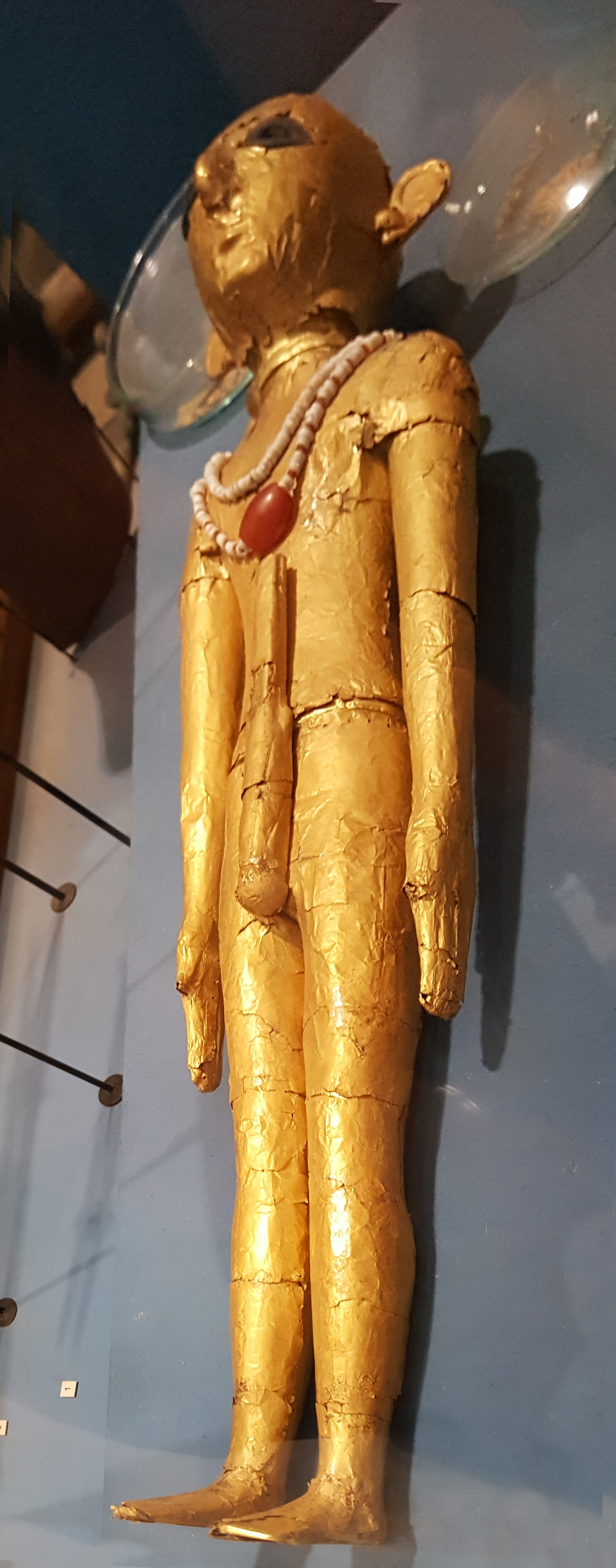
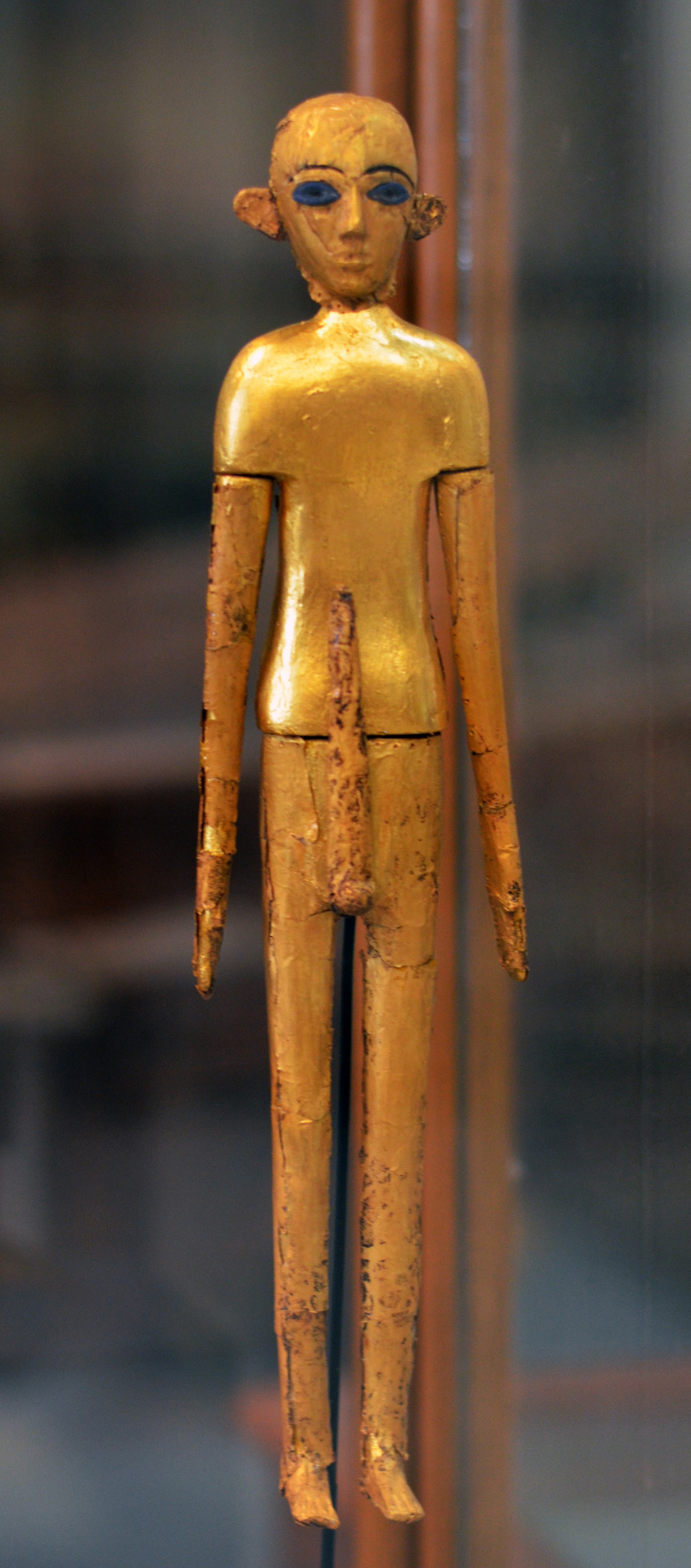
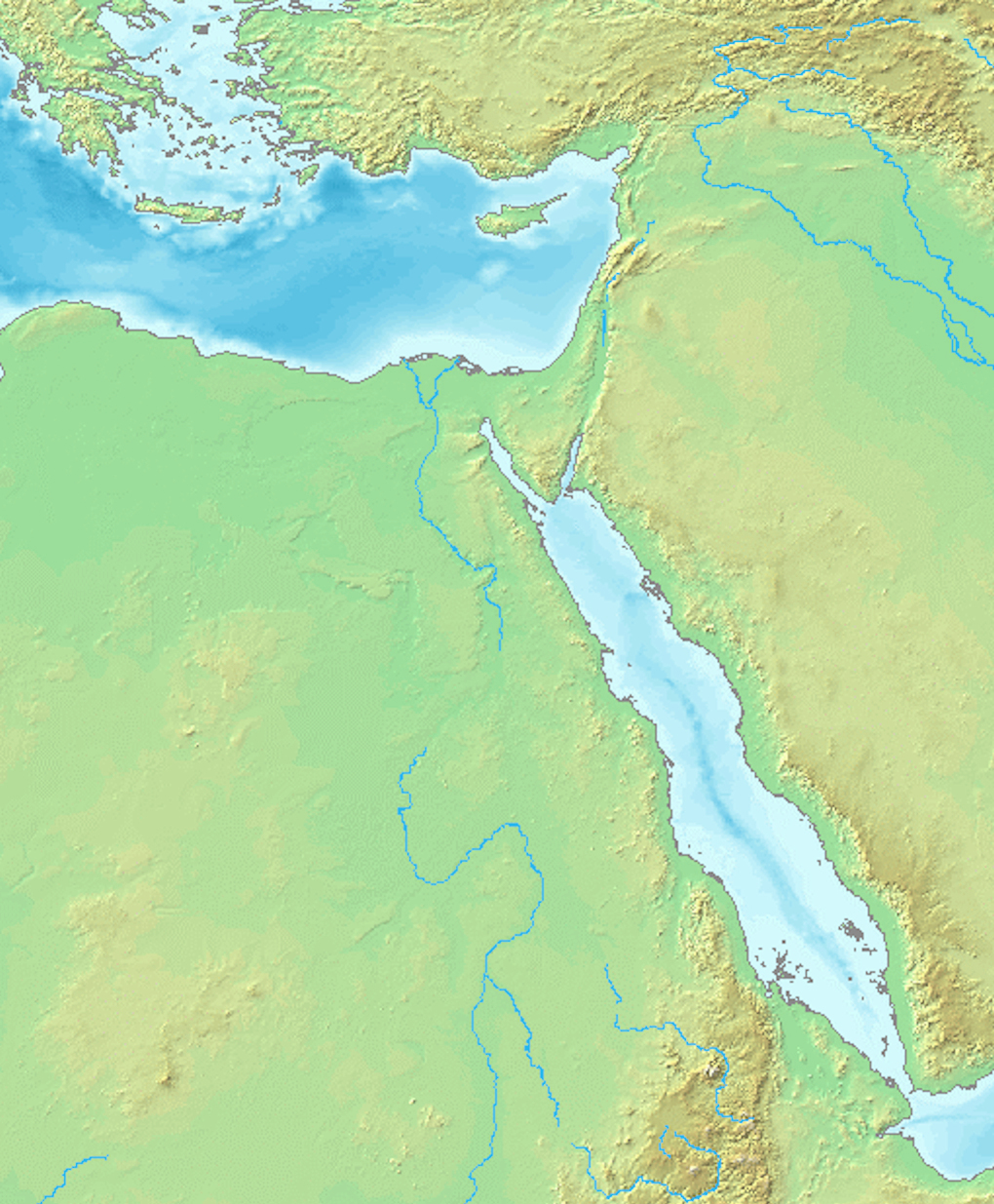
- Naqada IIIB, c. 3200–3100 BC. Naqada III (Egypt) Naqada III (Northeast Africa)
- Geographical range: Egypt
- Period: Early Bronze I
- Dates: c. 3,300 BC – 2,900 BC
- Major sites: Naqada, Tarkhan, Hierakonpolis, Tell el-Farkha
- Preceded by: Naqada II, Maadi culture
- Followed by: Early Dynastic Period; First Dynasty of Egypt

Naqada III is the last archaeological phase of the Naqada culture of ancient Egyptian prehistory. Depending on the sources, it is dated to approximately from 3325 to 3000 BC, from c. 3350 BC to c. 2920 BC, or from 3200 to 3000 BC. The period corresponds to Flinders Petrie's "Sequence Dates" SD 63–76.

It is the period during which the process of state formation, which began in Naqada II, became highly visible, with named kings heading powerful polities. Naqada III is often described as the Protodynastic Period of Egypt, and the later part of Naqada III is usually associated with Dynasty 0 to reflect the presence of kings at the head of influential states, although, in fact, the kings involved would not have been a part of a dynasty. In this period, those kings' names were inscribed in the form of serekhs on a variety of surfaces including pottery and tombs. The period was characterized by constant conflict with the people of the Nile Delta, probably for the control of valuable trade routes with the Levant.

The periodization of the Naqada Culture was originally developed by Flinders Petrie in the early 1900s. The defined periods have evolved since then and Naqada III is now further subdivided into IIIA1, IIIA2, IIIB1, IIIB2, IIIC1, IIIC2, and IIID subperiods.

== History ==
The Protodynastic Period in ancient Egypt was characterised by an ongoing process of political unification, culminating in the formation of a single state to begin the Early Dynastic Period. Furthermore, it is during this time that the Egyptian language was first recorded in hieroglyphs. There is also strong archaeological evidence of Egyptian settlements in southern Canaan during the Protodynastic Period, which are regarded as colonies or trading entrepôts.

Archaeologists Pierre de Miroschedji and Moain Sadeq hypothesise that the Egyptian activity in the Levant of this period can be classified in three parts: an area of permanent settlement including Tell es-Sakan (which may have been the administrative centre) and En Besor; an area extending north along the coast of seasonal habitation, and beyond this to the east and further north was an area of interaction between the Egyptians and the Canaanites.

State formation began during this era and perhaps even earlier. Various small city-states arose along the Nile. Centuries of conquest then reduced Upper Egypt to three major states: Thinis, Naqada, and Nekhen. Sandwiched between Thinis and Nekhen, Naqada was the first to fall. Thinis then conquered Lower Egypt. Nekhen's relationship with Thinis is uncertain, but these two states may have merged peacefully, with the Thinite royal family ruling all of Egypt. The Thinite kings were buried at Abydos in the Umm el-Qa'ab cemetery.

Early Egyptologists such as Flinders Petrie were proponents of the Dynastic race theory which hypothesised that the first Egyptian chieftains and rulers were themselves of Mesopotamian origin, but this view has been abandoned among modern scholars.

=== The "City of Gold' ===
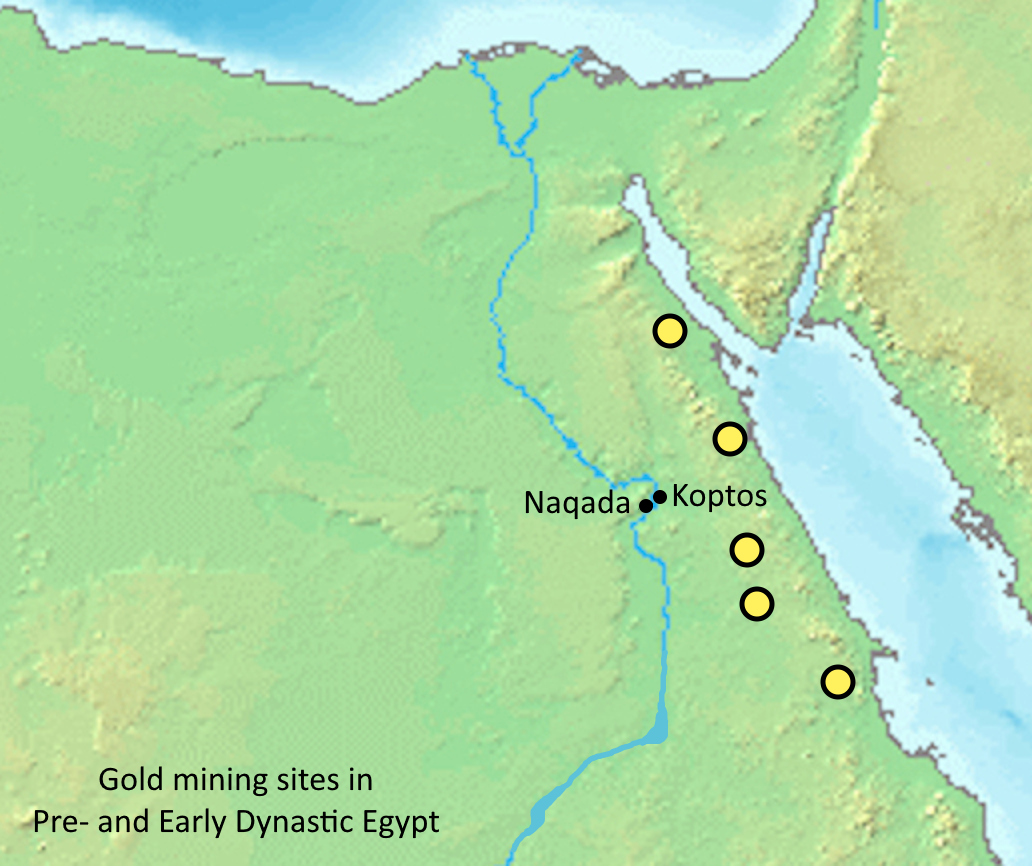
Gold mining sites in Pre- and Early Dynastic Egypt.

"Naqada" (Nubt) literally means "City of Gold", reflecting the exceptional wealth of the eastern desert region in gold, and the strategic position of Naqada and its facing town of Koptos for the commerce of that gold. The utilization of precious metals from the Eastern Desert, and the development of floodplain agriculture creating surpluses which could generate demand for a variety of crafts, made the region especially advanced in term of economic specialization and diversification, much more advanced than the regions of contemporary Lower Egypt. Imports from Mesopotamia appear to have been quite intensive during the late Gerzean period (late Naqada II), and correspond to the Protoliterate b and c cultures of Mesopotamia (Uruk period).

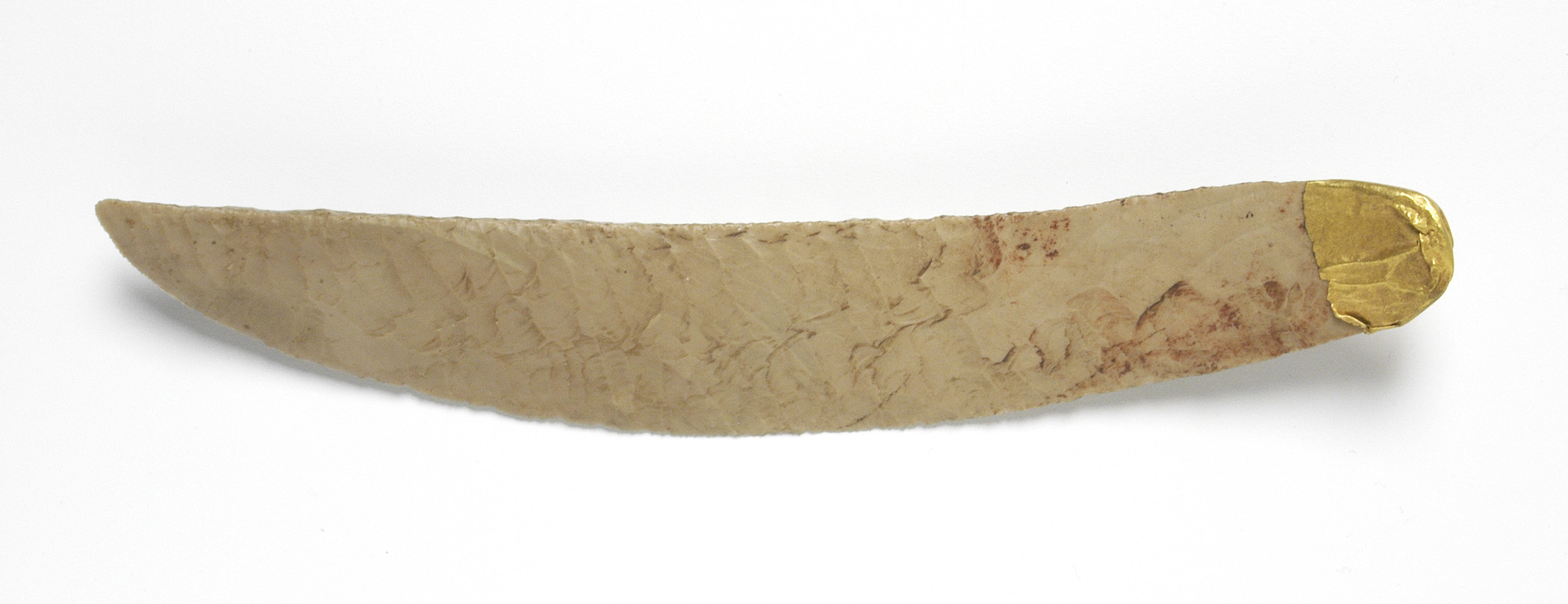
Naqada III flint knife with gold handle. Lacma.

Naqada was at the center of the developing trade of gold from the eastern desert of Egypt. This may have stimulated the direct involvement of Mesopotamian traders, who, accompanied by artists and various skilled personnel, may have introduced Mesopotamian styles and practices. The exploitation of gold may also have stimulated the development of the first organized proto-state structures in Egypt.

Gold production is documented through the creation of gold artifacts, going as far back as about 3500 BC. The extraction of gold occurred mainly in the older and younger granites of the Eastern Desert, through open pits and moderate underground digging.

==== Golden figurines ====
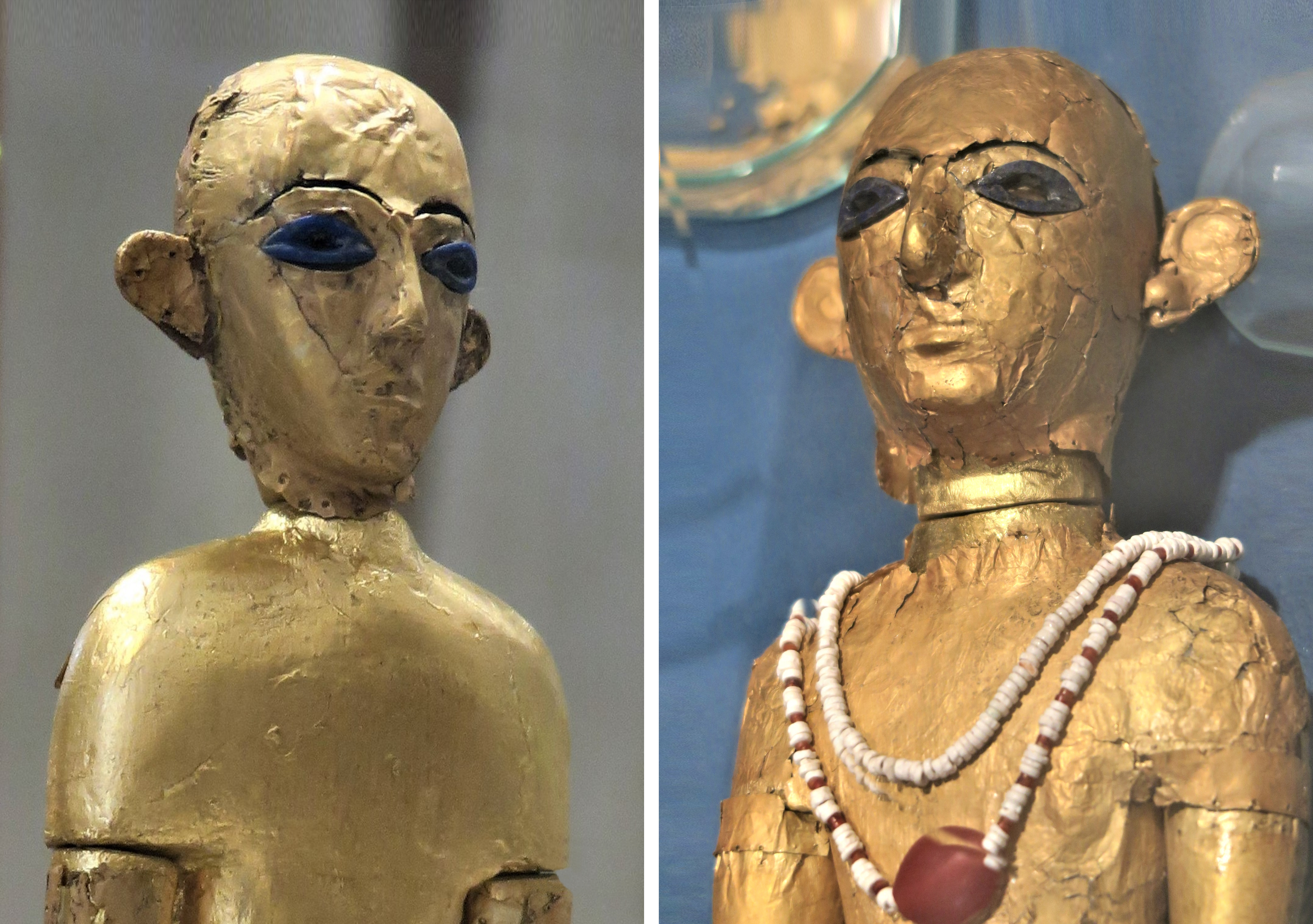
Detail of male figurines, Tell el-Farkha. Naqada IIIB, c. 3200–3000 BC

In 2006, a deposit of "gold foil, carnelian and ostrich eggshell beads of a necklace, and two large flint knives" was found at Tell el-Farkha, on the Eastern Kom. When reconstructed the gold fragments formed two statuettes of nude men with lapis lazuli eyes. The taller is around 60 cm tall, and the shorter about 30 cm. Both figures are depicted as bald and beardless with protruding ears, finely detailed finger- and toenails, and exaggerated phalluses. Each is also equipped with a large, upward-facing phallus sheath. The larger figure also has a beaded necklace and a decorative carved band on its penis sheath. The core of the statuettes, now entirely decomposed, was likely made of wood, which was covered with thin sheets of gold fastened by 140 golden rivets. The lapis lazuli came from what is now modern day Afghanistan.

These characteristics follow the stylistic conventions of Predynastic Egyptian art, similar to the Mahasna statuette (Amratian Period), or Mac Gregor Man statuette in the Ashmolean Museum. The golden statuettes most probably depict a Predynastic ruler and his son during the heb-sed festival, and they probably adorned a shrine in the Western Kom area. They are thought to belong to the Naqada IIIB period (c. 3200–3000 BC), or possibly even Naqada IIIA (circa 3300 BC). They are thought to be the oldest known depictions of Ancient Egyptian rulers.

=== Northern expansion ===
The people of Naqada II and Naqada III seem to have expanded northward into Lower Egypt, replacing the Maadian culture. Maadi was first conquered during Naqada II c-d. The cultures of Lower Egypt were replaced by Upper Egypt and Naqada culture by the end of Naqada II c. 3200 BC. The Maadian culture of Buto, Tell Ibrahim Awad, Tell el-Rub'a, Tell el-Murra, and Tell el-Farkha were vacated, giving way to the Naqada III culture.

=== Technological innovations ===
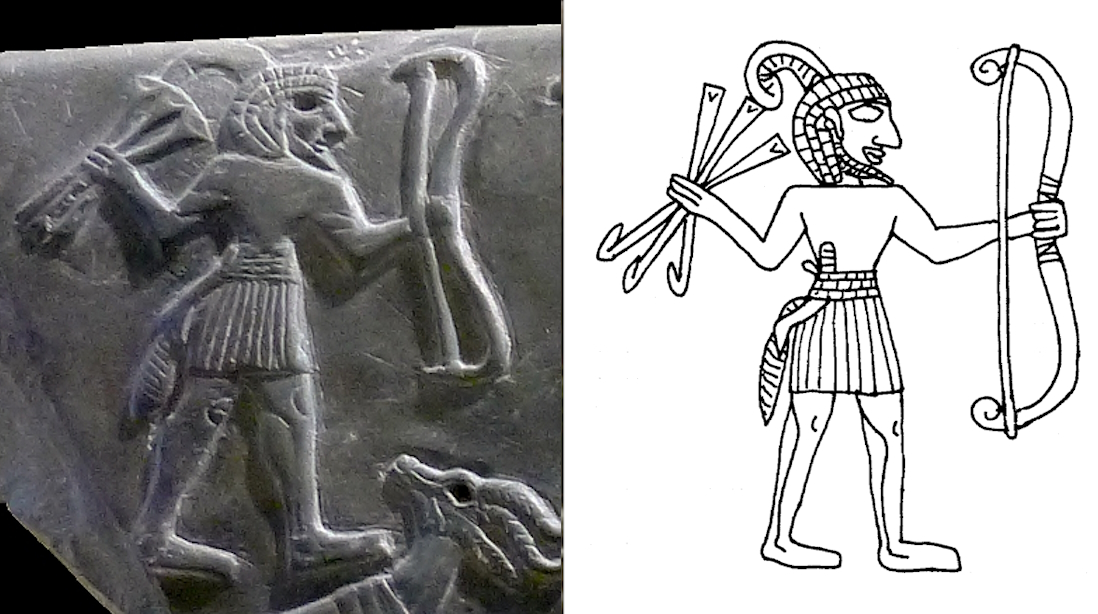
Hunter detail, in Hunters Palette, circa 3100, Abydos, Naqada III. Louvre Museum.

Naqada III extended all over Egypt and was characterized by some notable firsts:

- The first hieroglyphs
- The first graphical narratives on palettes
- The first regular use of serekhs
- Possibly the first example of irrigation

And at best, a notable second:

- The invention of sail navigation (derived from its prior invention in the Persian Gulf 2,000 years earlier)

According to Egypt's Ministry of Antiquities, Egyptian archaeologists in February 2020 uncovered 83 tombs dating back to 3,000 BC, known as the Naqada III period. Various small ceramic pots in different shapes and some sea shells, makeup tools, eyeliner pots, and jewels were also revealed in the burial.

=== Decorative cosmetic palettes ===
During Naqada III, the highly decorated ivory sculptures of Naqada II were replaced by decorated greywacke palettes. Many notable decorative palettes are dated to Naqada III, such as the Hunters Palette. During the Naqada IIIA period (IIIA1 and IIIA2), cosmetic palettes are dominated by rectangular shapes.

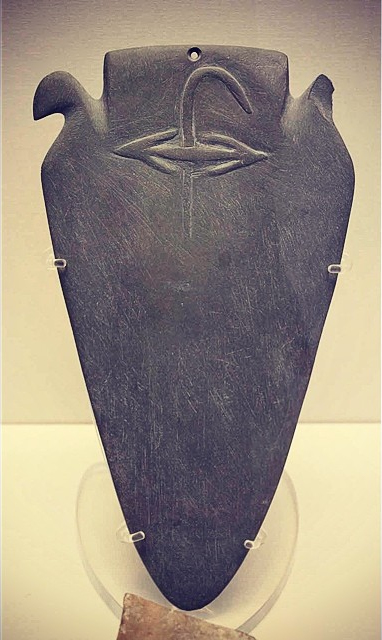
The Min Palette: a mudstone palette with the archaic hieroglyph for the god of fertility Min in relief. Naqada III, c. 3250–3100 BC. El-Amra.

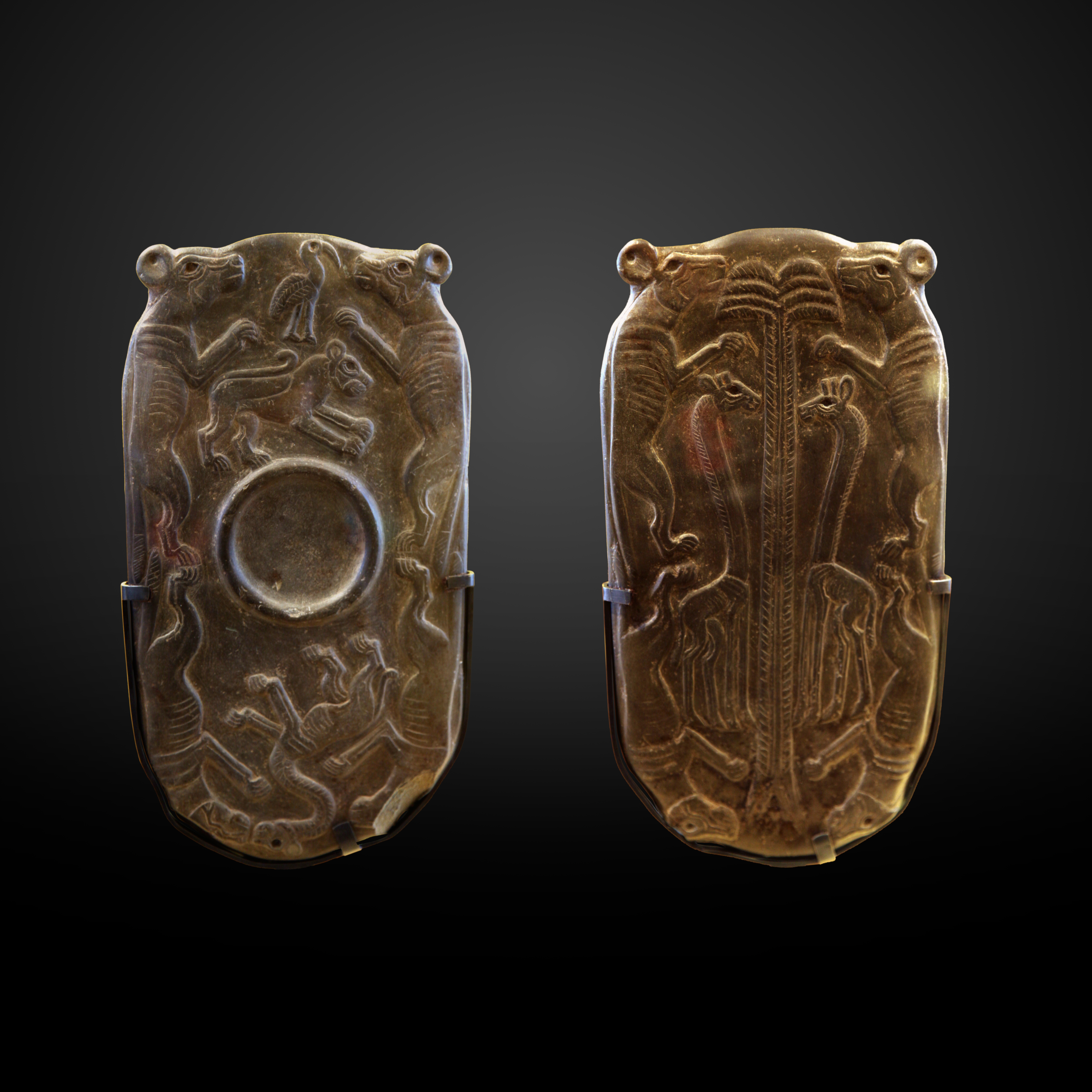
"Four Dogs Palette" (c. 3300–3100 BC).

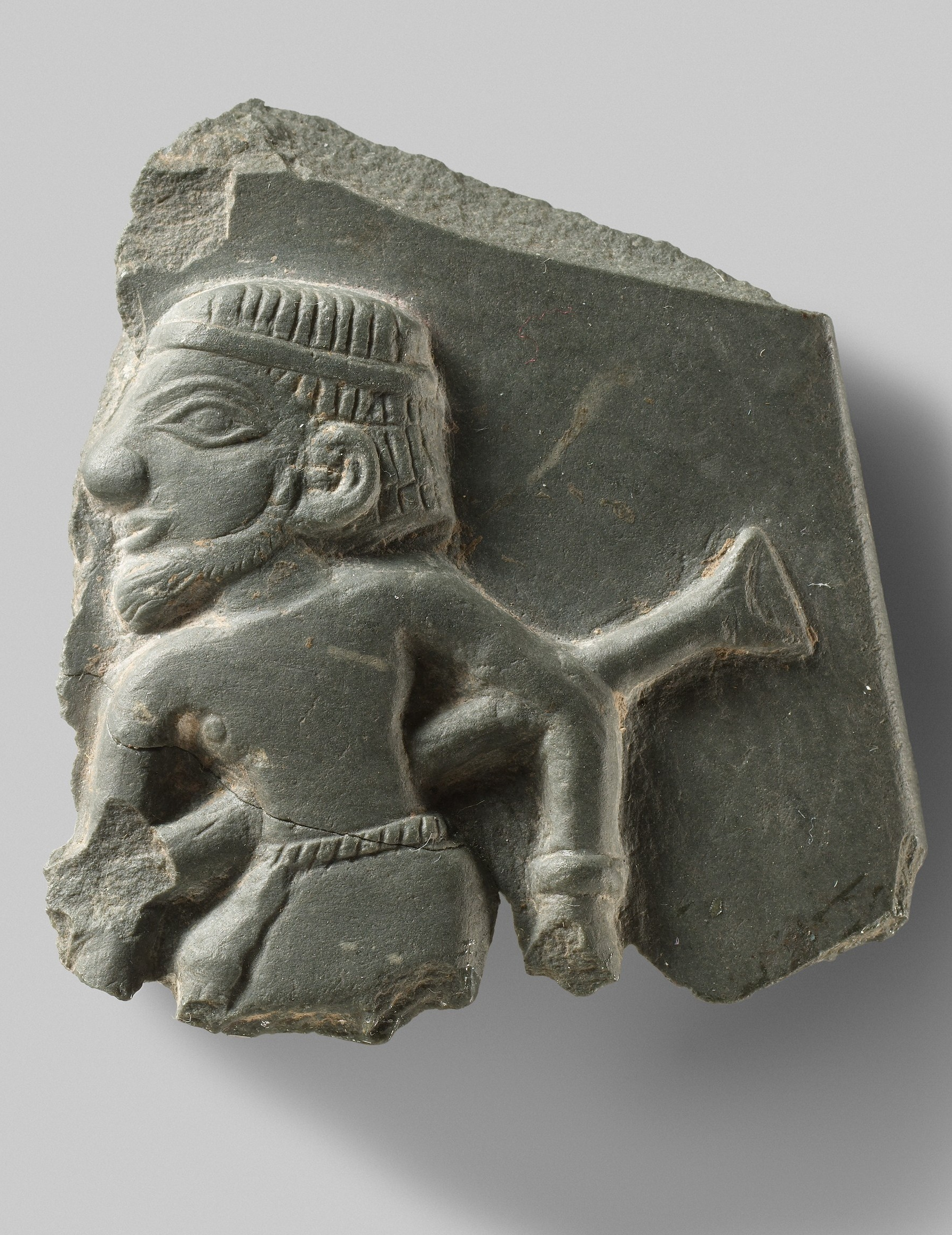
Fragment of a ceremonial palette illustrating a man and a type of staff, c. 3200–3100 BC.

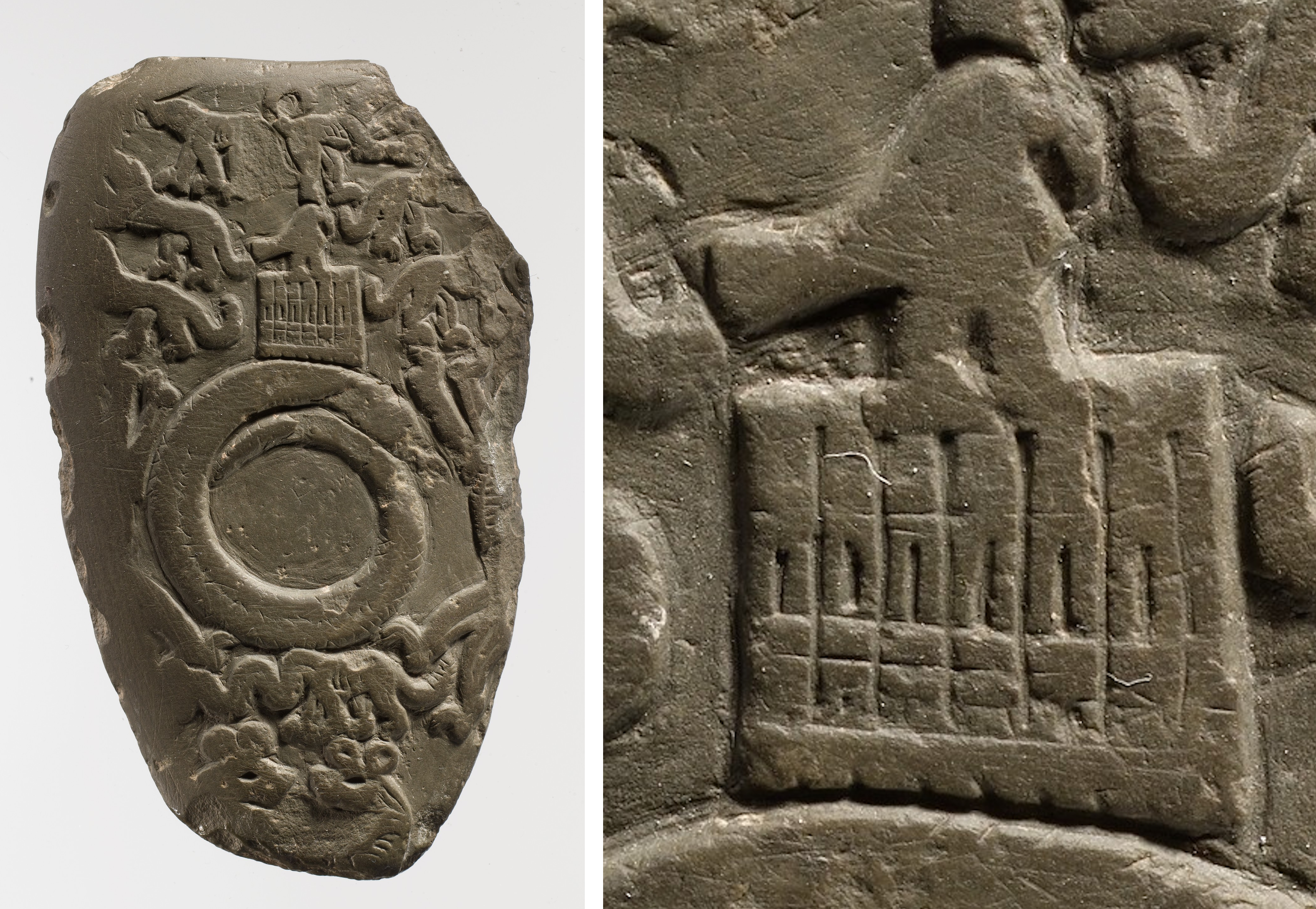
Carved ceremonial palette with serekh, Late Naqada III c. 3200–3100 BC.

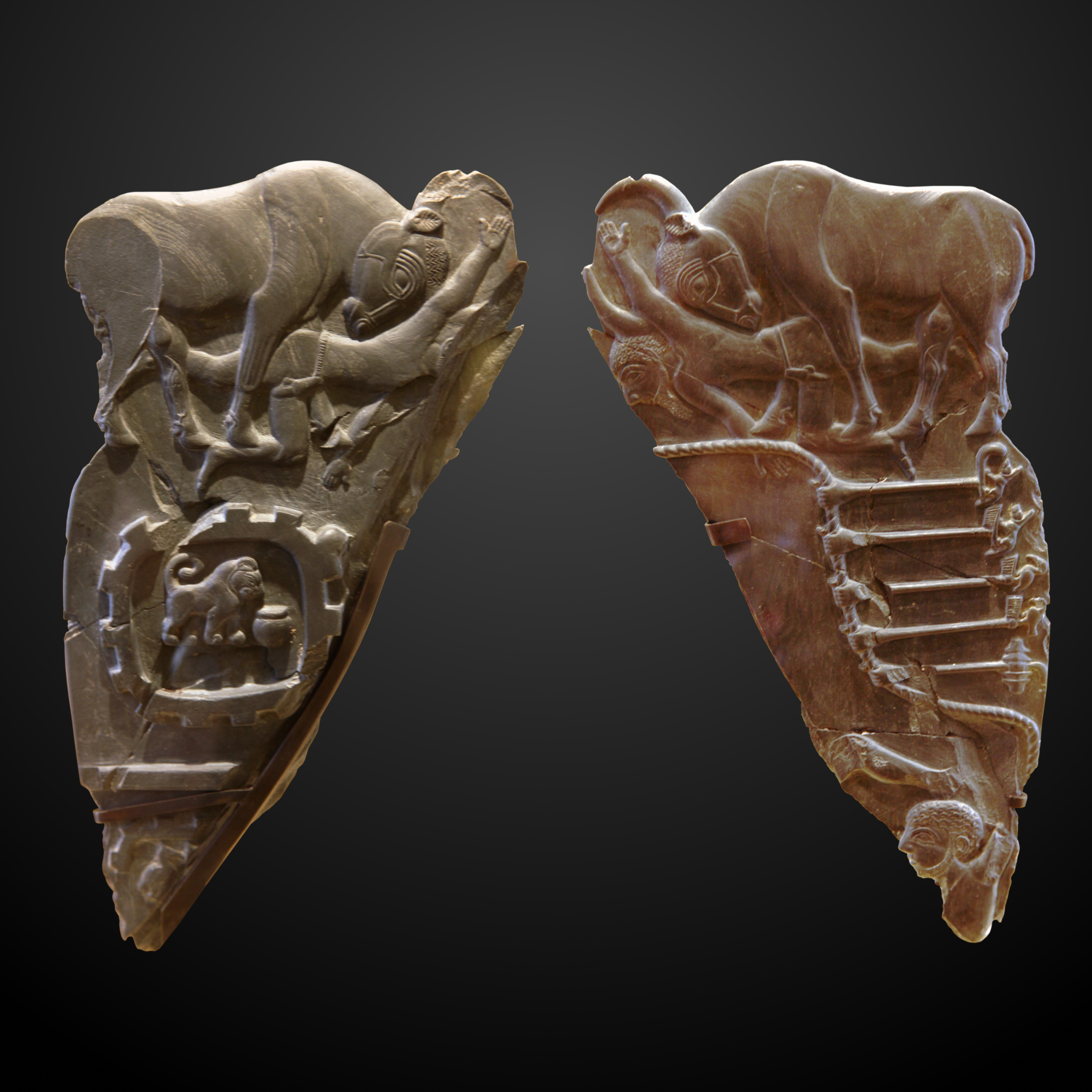
Bull Palette, 3100 BC.

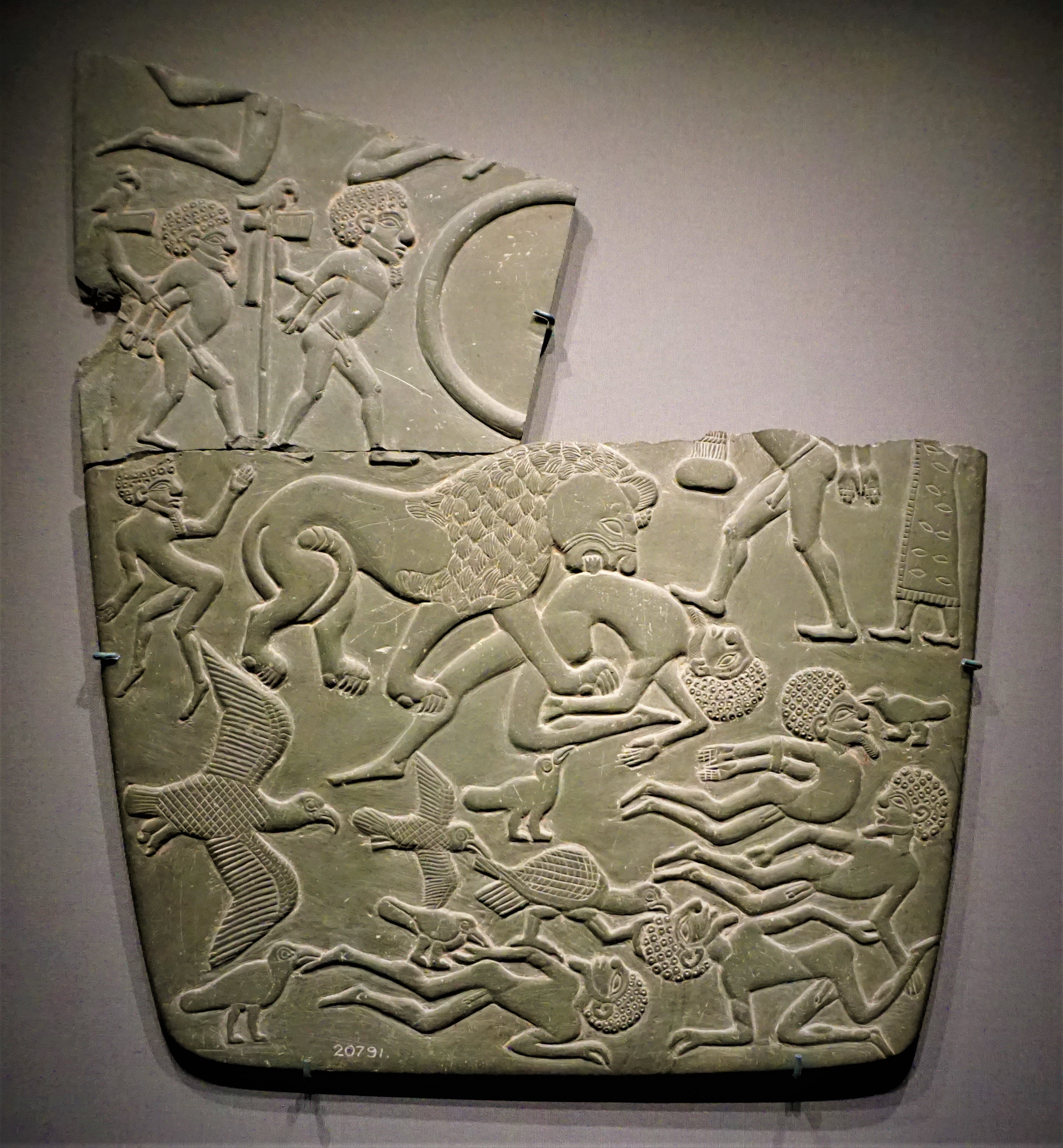
The Battlefield Palette, possibly showing the subjection of the people of the Buto-Maadi culture, by the Egyptian rulers of Naqada III, c. 3100 BC.

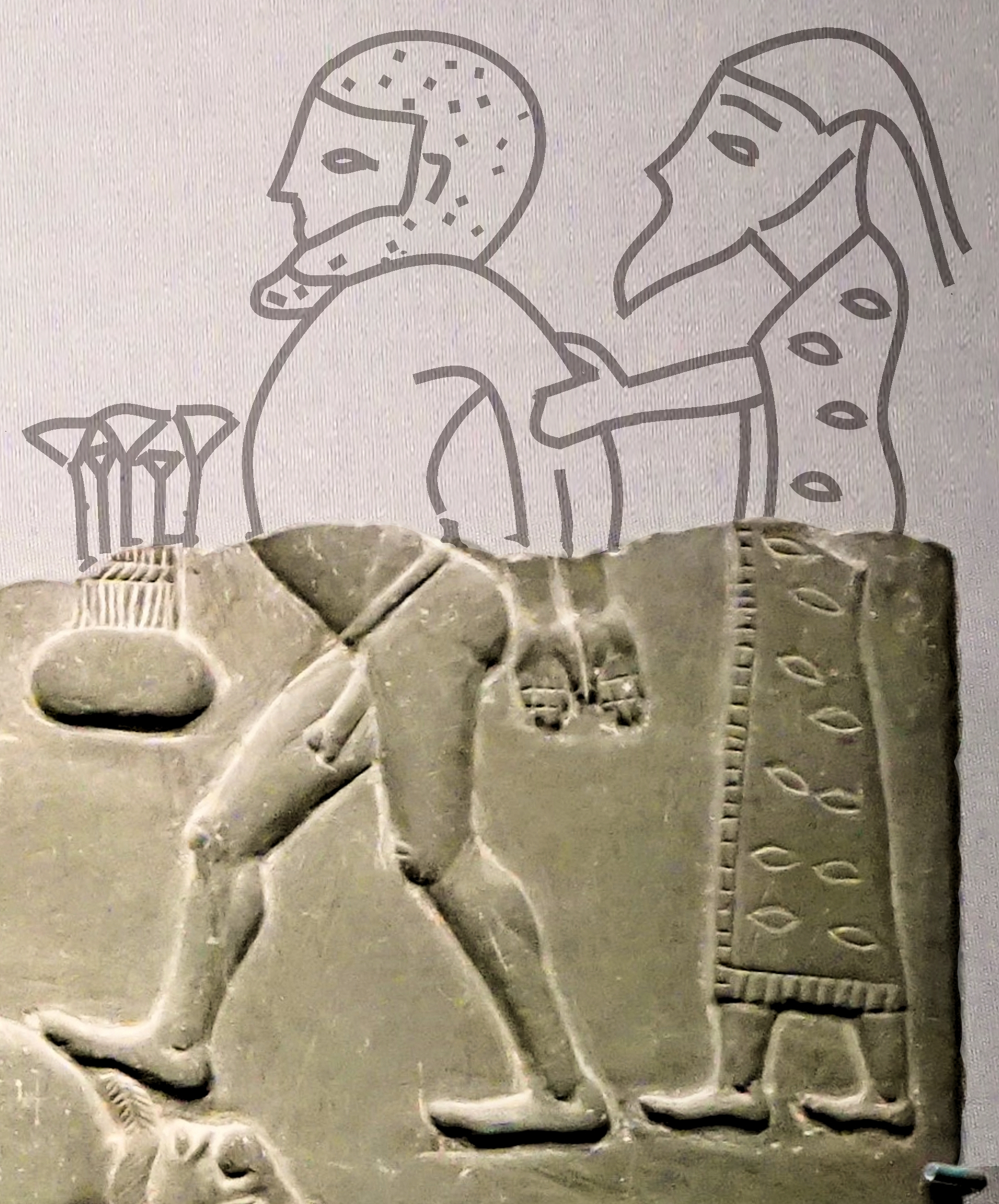
Man in patterned and fringed dress, holding a naked prisoner, in the Battlefield Palette, c. 3100 BC.

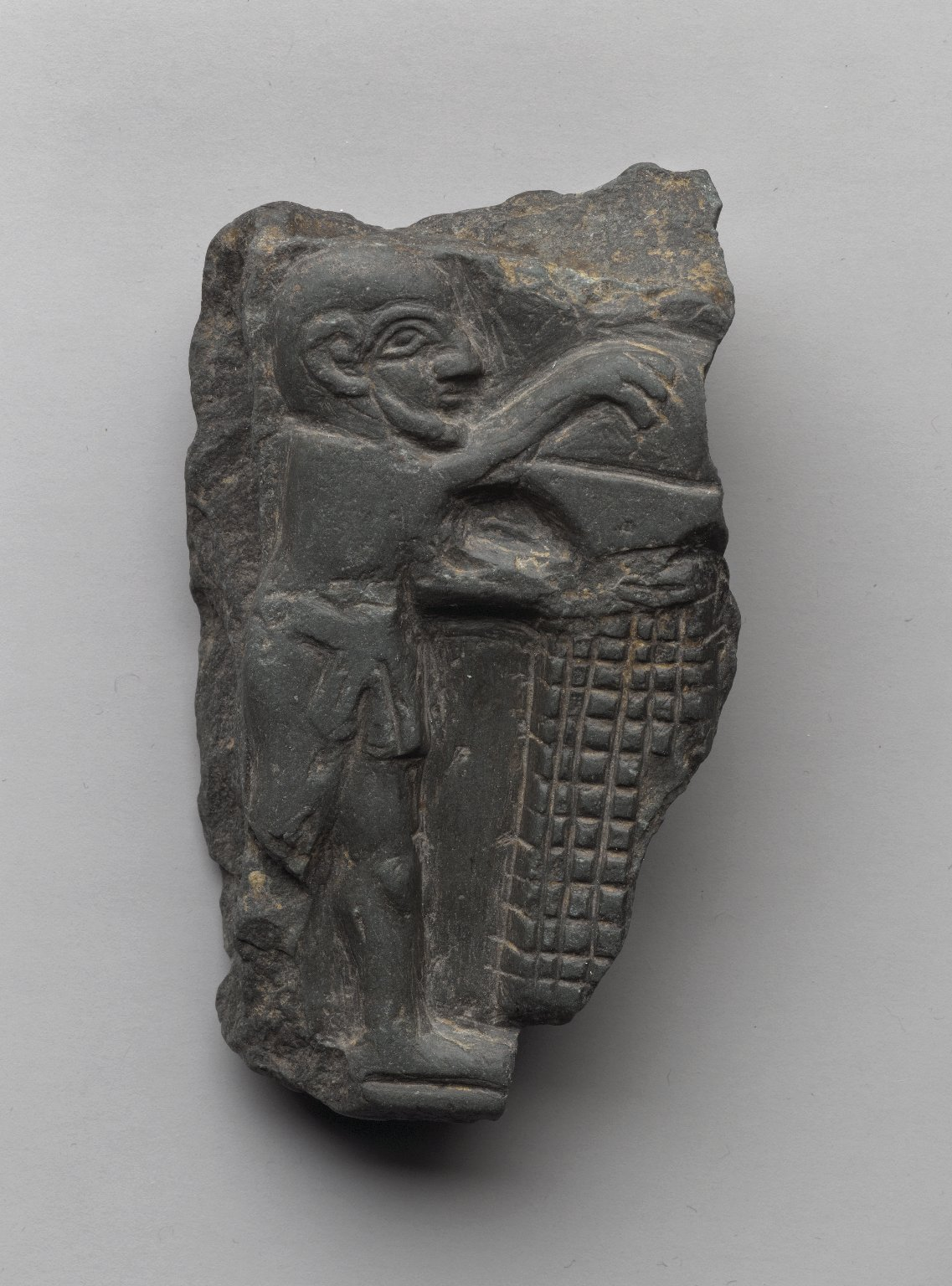
Fragment of a palette, c. 3200–2800 BC.

=== Penile sheaths ===
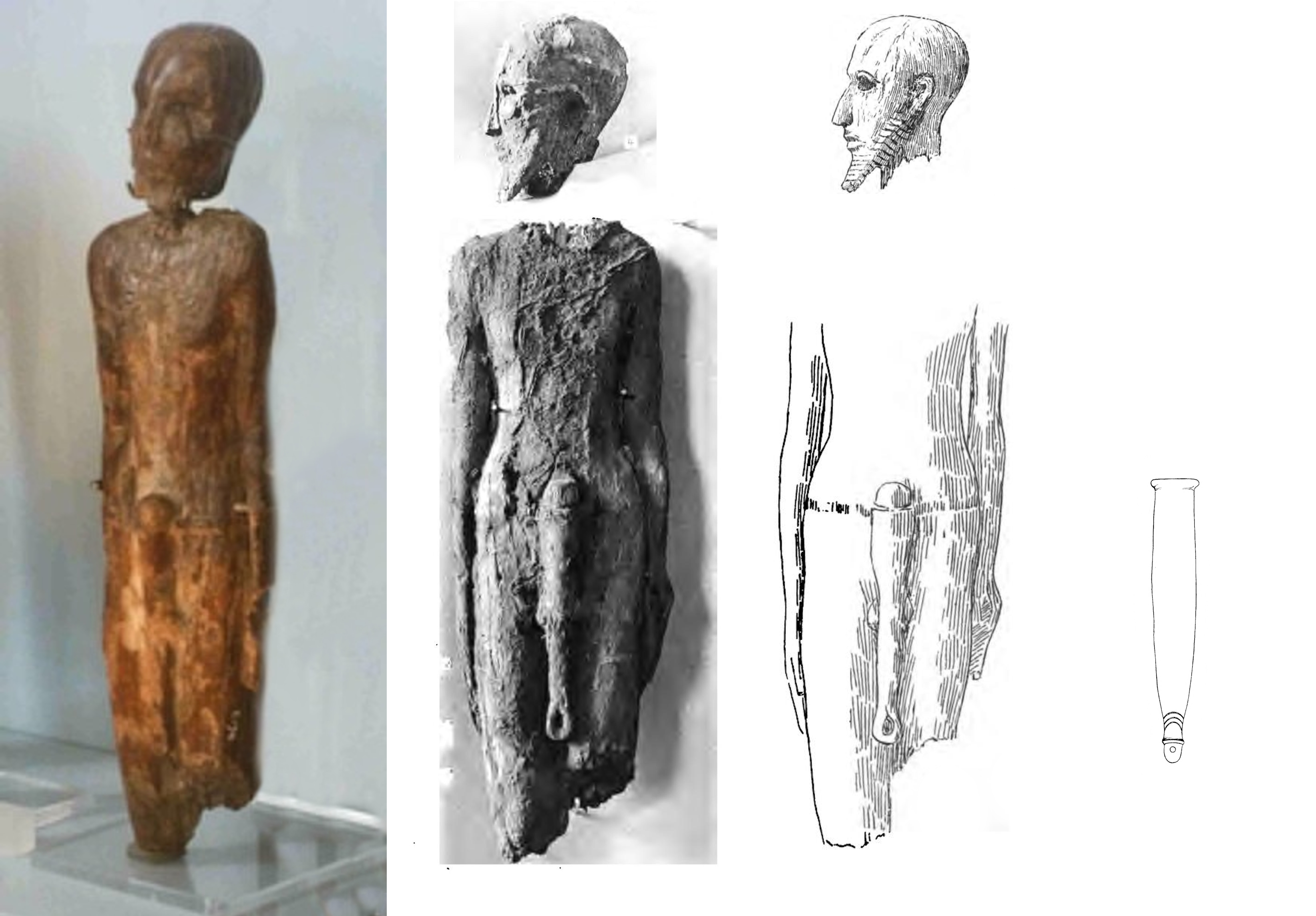
Statuette E.174 with penile sheath, Hierakonpolis. Naqada III (3300–3000 BC) – Early Dynastic, Dynasty I (3000–2890 BC).

Numerous male statuettes from the Naqada I-III period are shown displaying penile sheaths, a characteristic attribute of many hunter-gatherer societies. Such depictions appear in Hierakonpolis, Abydos, on the Gebel el-Arak Knife, or on the golden statuettes of Tell el-Farkha. They were held in place by leather strings tied at the waist, and possible at the bottom as well.

It has been suggested that many of the decorated hippopotamus tusks also found in tombs of the period may be the very penile sheaths depicted in these statuettes, or at least symbolic representations of them. Penile sheath (karnatiw) may also have been used for medical reasons, in a mistaken attempt to avoid schistosomiasis and contamination by cercariae.

== Pottery vessels ==
Naqada II pottery mainly uses two types of clay. First, a grey clay from the alluvium of the Nile, which is rich in ferrous oxide and becomes red to brown upon firing in an oxidizing environment. Second, a clay of limestone origin or marly (a mix limestone and clay), obtained from regular rivers and wadis, which is yellowish to white due to its high content in calcium, and becomes creamy upon firing. Most potteries of the Naqada III period used the second type.

Naqada III practiced, to various extents, most of the types of pottery known from the Naqada period, but most of the production tended to be monochrome, with sometimes simple designs in relief. Naqada III was categorized chronologically by Petrie from SD ("Sequence Date") 63 to 76:

- Late ware (type "L", Naqada IIC, IID): a type of pottery in creamy marly clay, which became the majority of Naqada III production
- Decorated ware (type "D", all Naqada II): a type of pottery with beige to pink surface and ochre to brown paintings, which disappeared with Naqada III
- Black Top ware (type "B", all Naqada II): polished red body with black top, an archaic type known since the Badarian
- Fancy Forms ware (type "F", all Naqada II): Pottery with fancy shapes or animal-shaped
- Polished Red ware (type "P", Naqada IIB, IIC, IID): red polished pottery
- Rough ware (type "R", all Naqada II): a type of pottery with vegetal particles which burn upon firing and create an uneven surface.
- Wavy-handled ware (type "W", Naqada IIC, IID): type of vessels with wavy handles, becoming cylindrical

During the Naqada IIIA period (IIIA1 and IIIA2), Decorated ware ("D-ware") and Polished Red ware ("P-ware") decline, while Late ware ("L-ware") increased considerably. Wavy-handled ware ("W-ware") exist only with banded decoration. During Naqada IIIB, L-ware dominates, together with important productions of W-ware in the form of cylindrical incised jars. Rough ware ("R-ware") declines, especially pointed-base styles.

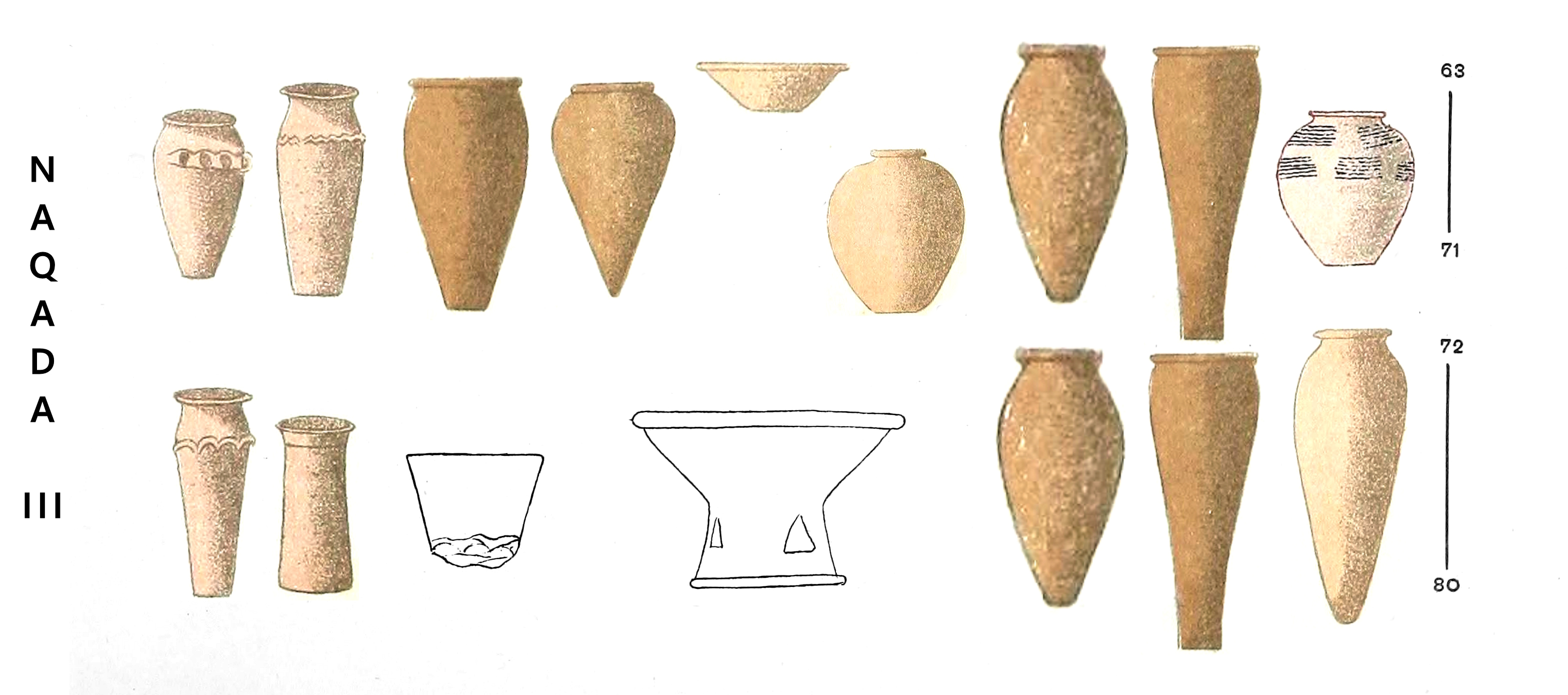
Naqada III pottery

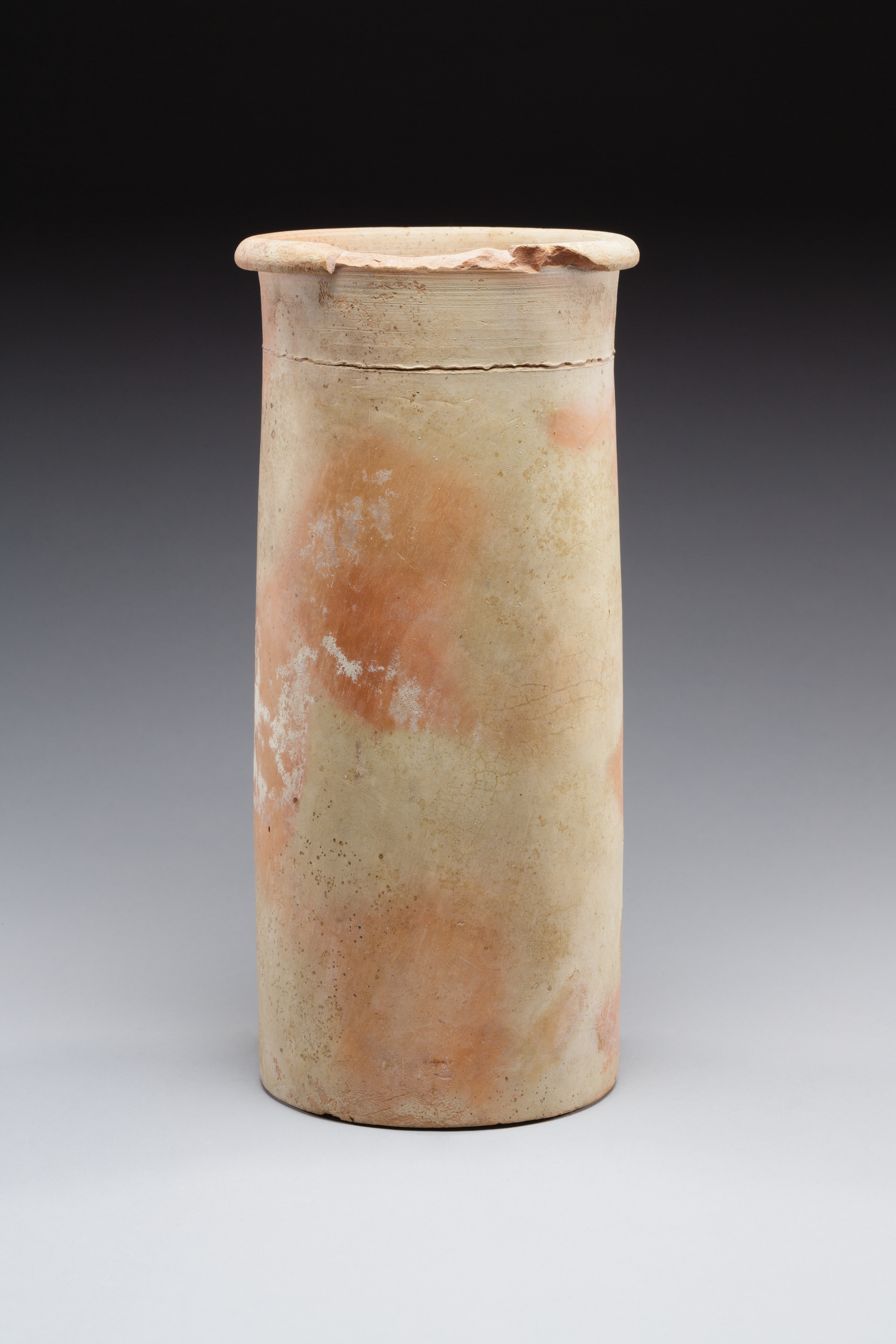
Typical Naqada III cylindrical jar

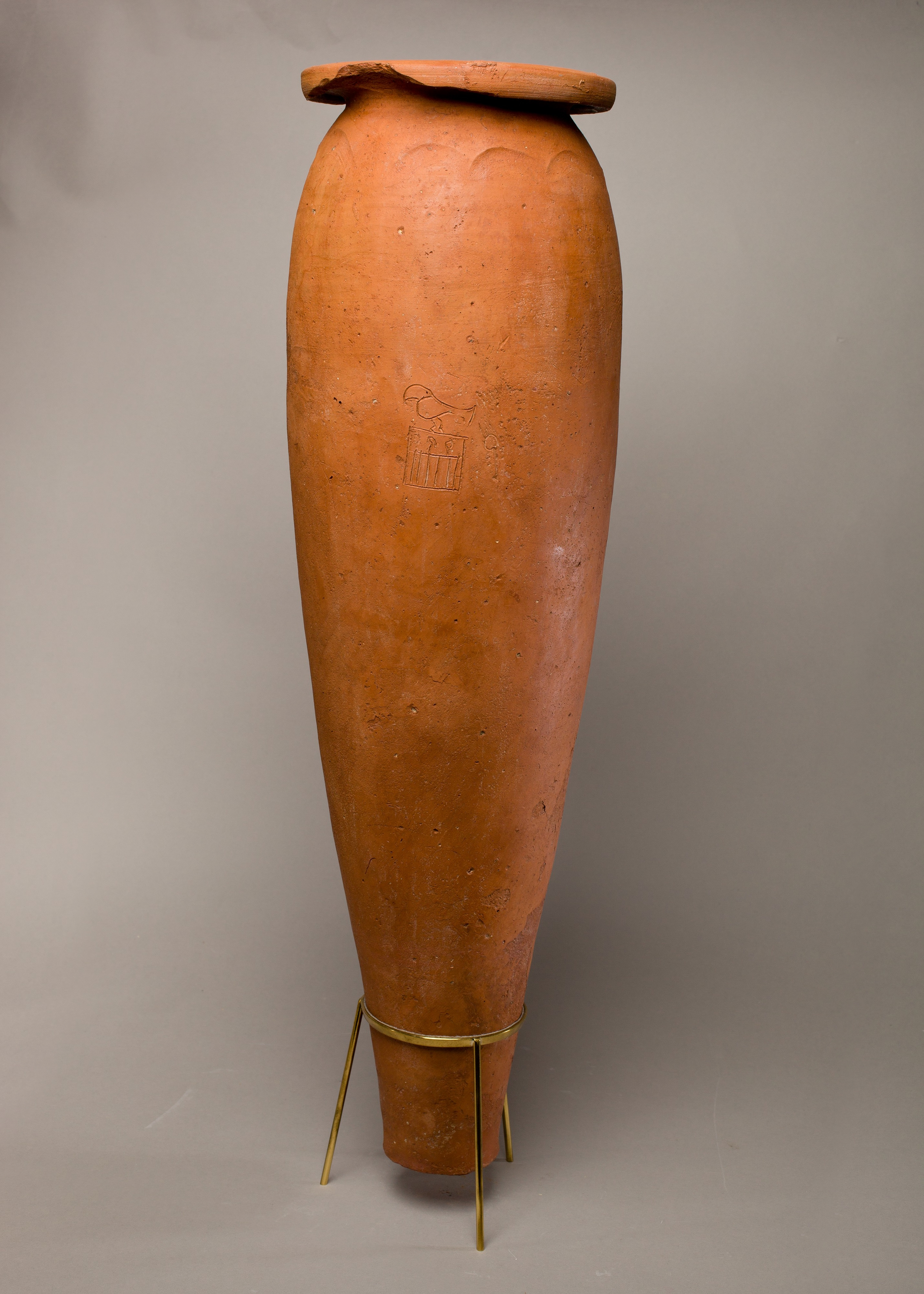
Wine jar with serekh, 3300-2900 BCE

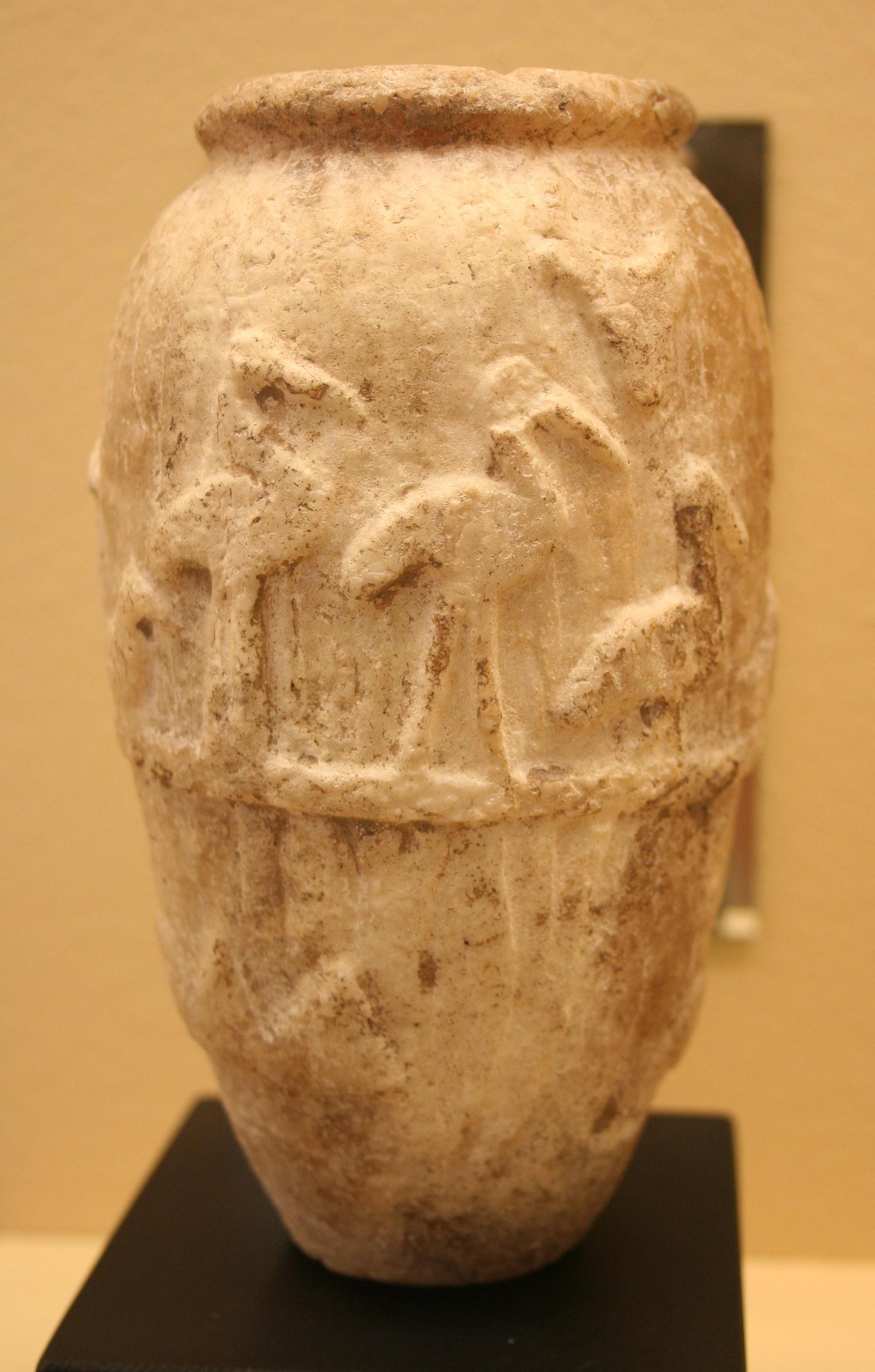
Naqada III stone vessel

== Dynasty 0 ==
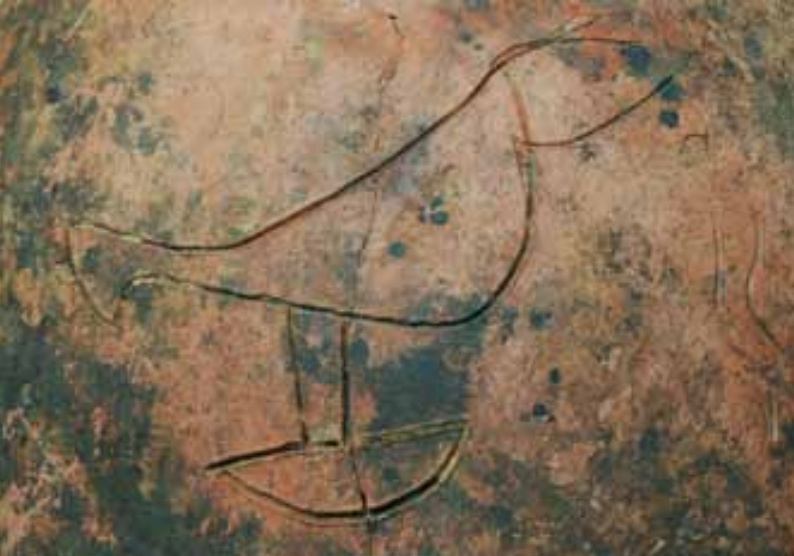
Name of King Iry-Hor, Dynasty 0, Eastern Kom, Tell el-Farkha.

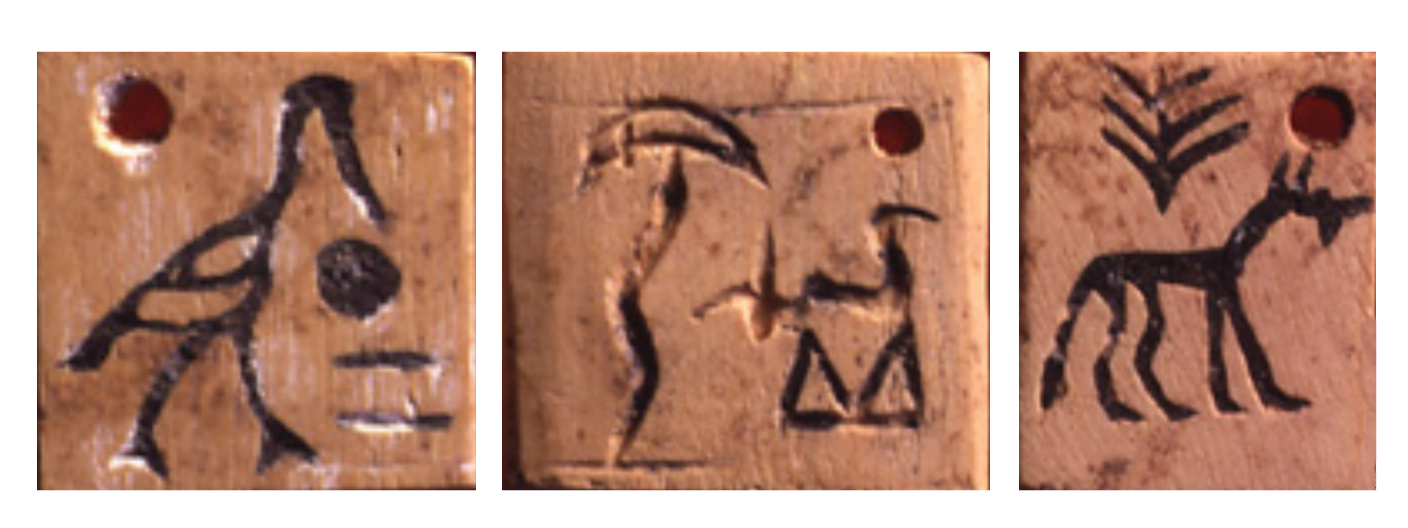
Designs on tokens from Abydos, carbon dated to c. 3400–3200 BC. They are similar to contemporary tags from Uruk.

The Egyptian rulers of the period belong to the so-called "Dynasty 0", and may have ruled over some parts of Upper Egypt. They include rather obscure rulers such as Crocodile, Iry-Hor, Ka, and perhaps the king Scorpion II, whose name may refer to, or be derived from, the goddess Serket, a special early protector of other deities and the rulers. The period ended with the rise of Narmer, who became the first king of the First Dynasty and the first unifier of Egypt.

For Upper Egypt in the south, the following Dynasty 0 rulers have been listed: A, Finger Snail, Fish, Elephant, Stork, Bull, Scorpion I, Crocodile, Iry-Hor, Ka, Scorpion II, Narmer / Menes.

For Lower Egypt in the north, the following Dynasty 0 rulers have been listed: Hedju Hor, Ny-Hor, Ni-Neith, Hat-Hor, Pu, Hsekiu, Khayu, Tiu, Thesh, Neheb, Wazner, Mekh, Double Falcon, Wash.

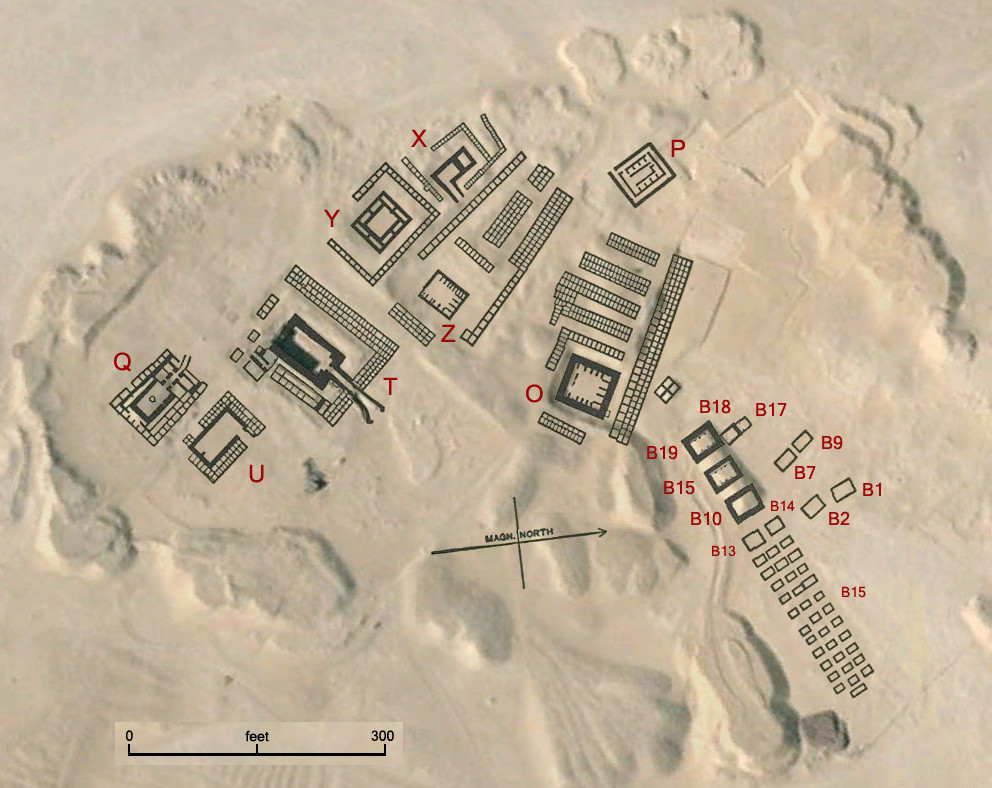
Iry-Hor's tomb at the Umm el-Qa'ab comprises two separate chambers B1 and B2, and Ka's tomb is in B7, B8, B9

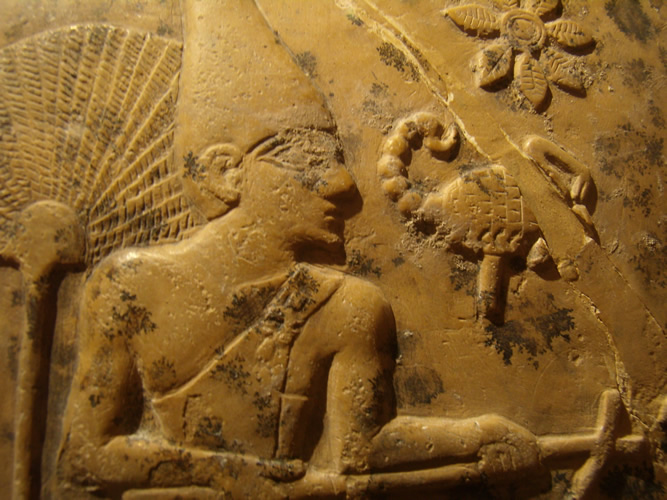
Dynasty 0 Pharaoh Scorpion II on the Scorpion Macehead, 3200-3000 BC, Ashmolean Museum

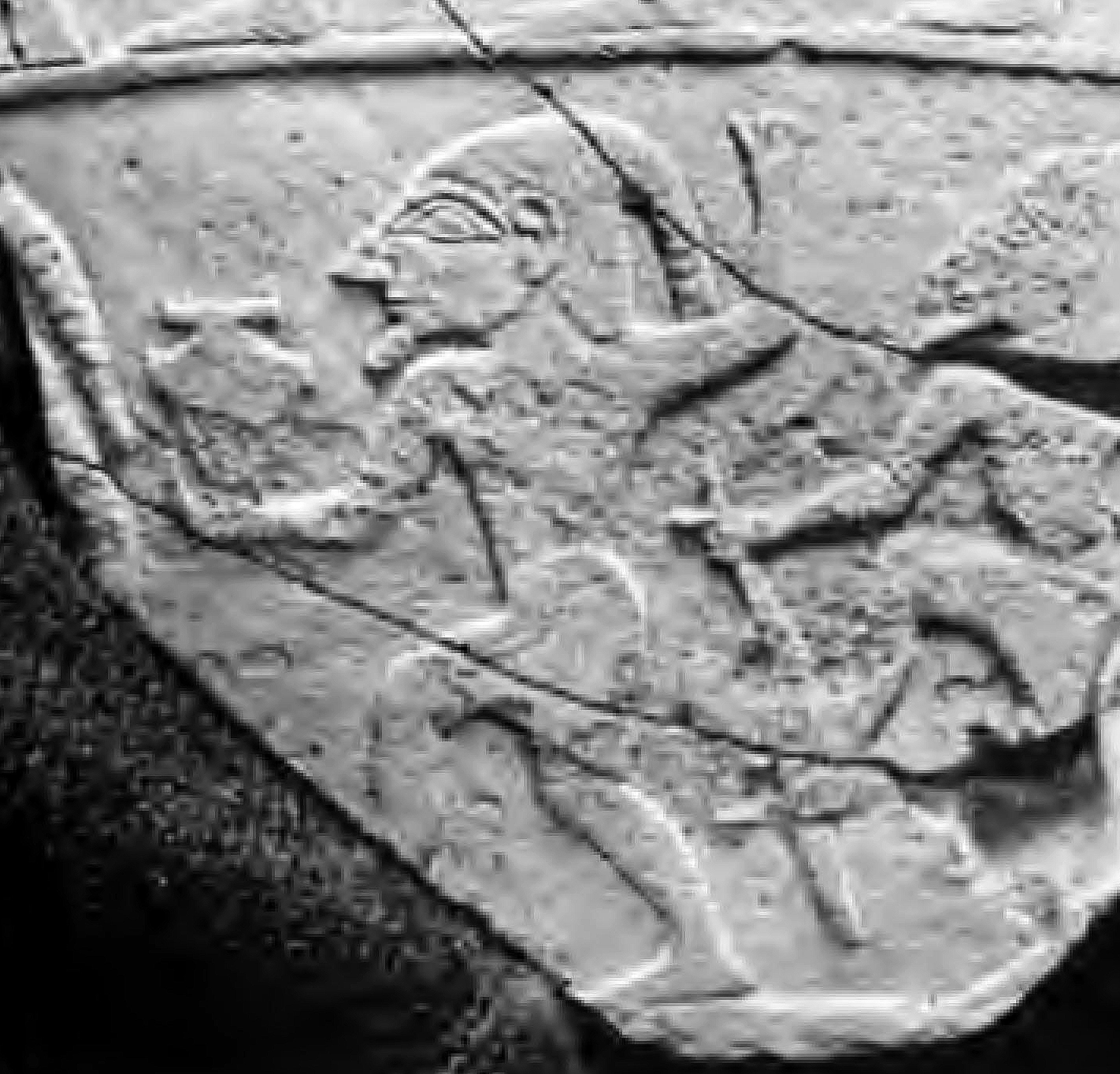
An individual carrying presents, on King Scorpion's Minor Macehead

== Early dynastic genetics ==
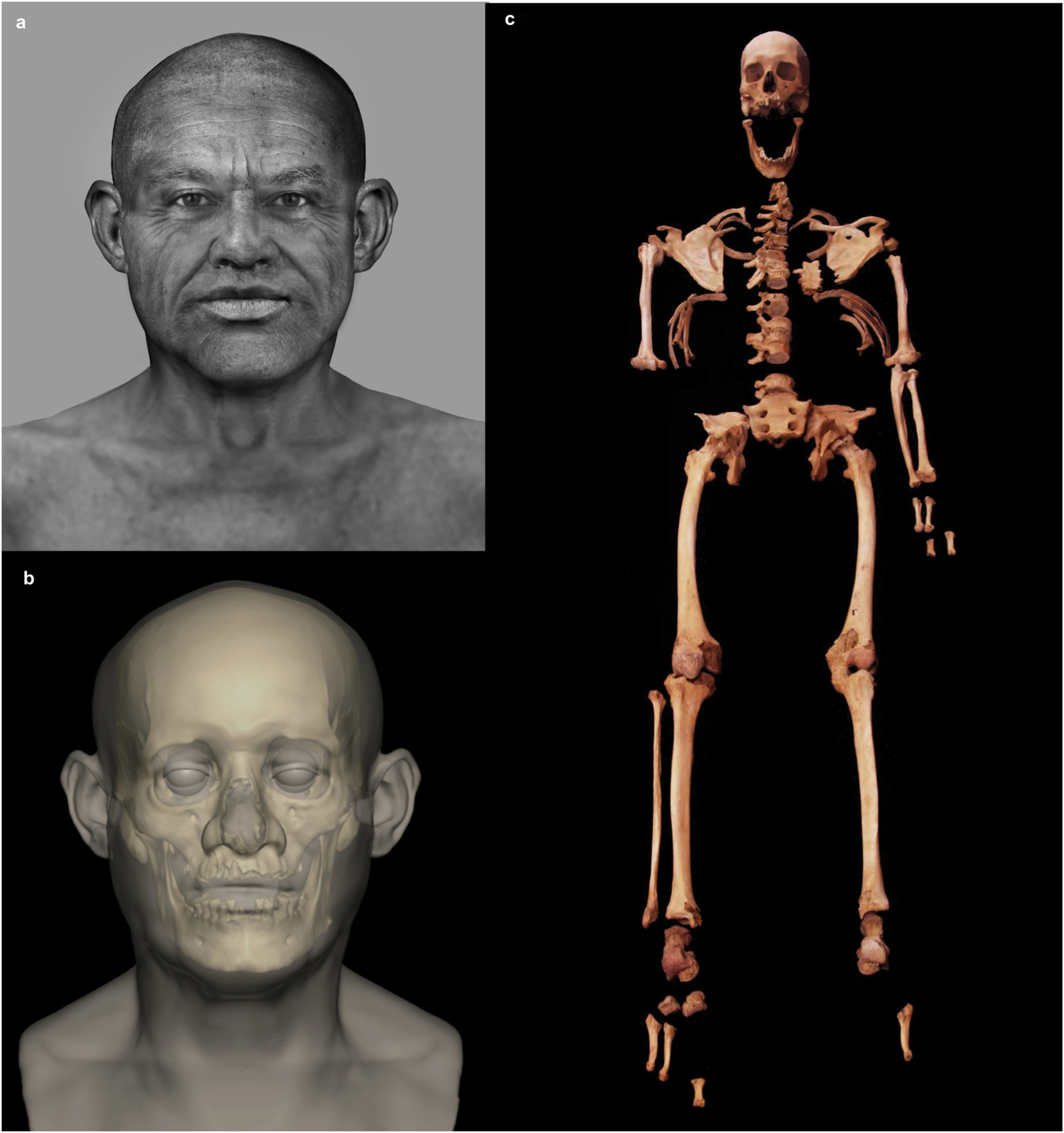
Facial reconstruction and depiction created from the Nuwayrat Early Dynastic individual, carbon dated to 2855–2570 BC, soon after the end of the Neolithic period.

For the first time in 2025, a study was able to give insights into the genetic background of Early Dynastic Egyptians, by sequencing the whole genome of an Old Kingdom adult male Egyptian of relatively high-status, radiocarbon-dated to 2855–2570 BC, which was excavated in Nuwayrat (Nuerat, نويرات), in a cliff 265 km south of Cairo. Before this study, whole-genome sequencing of ancient Egyptians from the early periods of Egyptian Dynastic history had not yet been accomplished, mainly because of the problematic DNA preservation conditions in Egypt.

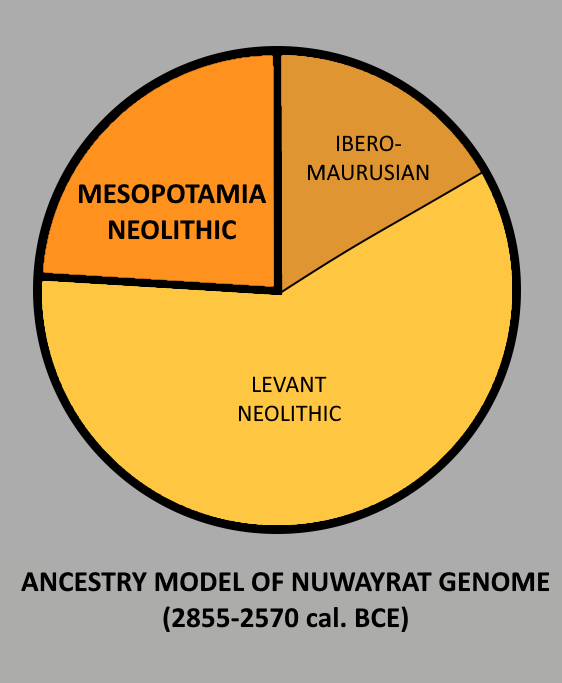
Ancestry model of 3rd millennium Egyptian genome from Nuwayrat.

The corpse had been placed intact in a large circular clay pot without embalming, and then installed inside a cliff tomb, which accounts for the comparatively good level of conservation of the skeleton and its DNA. Most of his genome was found to be associated with North African Neolithic ancestry, but about 20% of his genetic ancestry could be sourced to the eastern Fertile Crescent, including Mesopotamia. The genetic profile was most closely represented by a two-source model, in which 77.6% ± 3.8% of the ancestry corresponded to genomes from the Middle Neolithic Moroccan site of Skhirat-Rouazi (dated to 4780–4230 BC), which itself consists of predominantly (76.4 ± 4.0%) Levant Neolithic ancestry and (23.6 ± 4.0%) minor Iberomaurusian ancestry, while the remainder (22.4% ± 3.8%) was most closely related to known genomes from Neolithic Mesopotamia (dated to 9000–8000 BC). Genomes from the Neolithic/Chalcolithic Levant only appeared as a minor third-place component in three-source models. A 2022 DNA study had already shown evidence of gene flow from the Mesopotamian and Zagros regions into surrounding areas, including Anatolia, during the Neolithic, but not as far as Egypt yet.

Overall, the 2025 study "provides direct evidence of genetic ancestry related to the eastern Fertile Crescent in ancient Egypt". This genetic connection suggests that there had been ancient migration flows from the eastern Fertile Crescent to Egypt, in addition to the exchanges of objects and imagery (domesticated animals and plants, writing systems...) already observed. This suggests a pattern of wide cultural and demographic expansion from the Mesopotamian region, which affected both Anatolia and Egypt during this period.

The Mesopotamian ancestors of the Nuwayrat individual may have migrated to Egypt during the Neolithic period, or may have arrived in a relatively recent period through a yet unknown migration through the Near-East, or alternatively through direct sea-routes in the Mediterranean or the Red Sea.

== Other artifacts ==
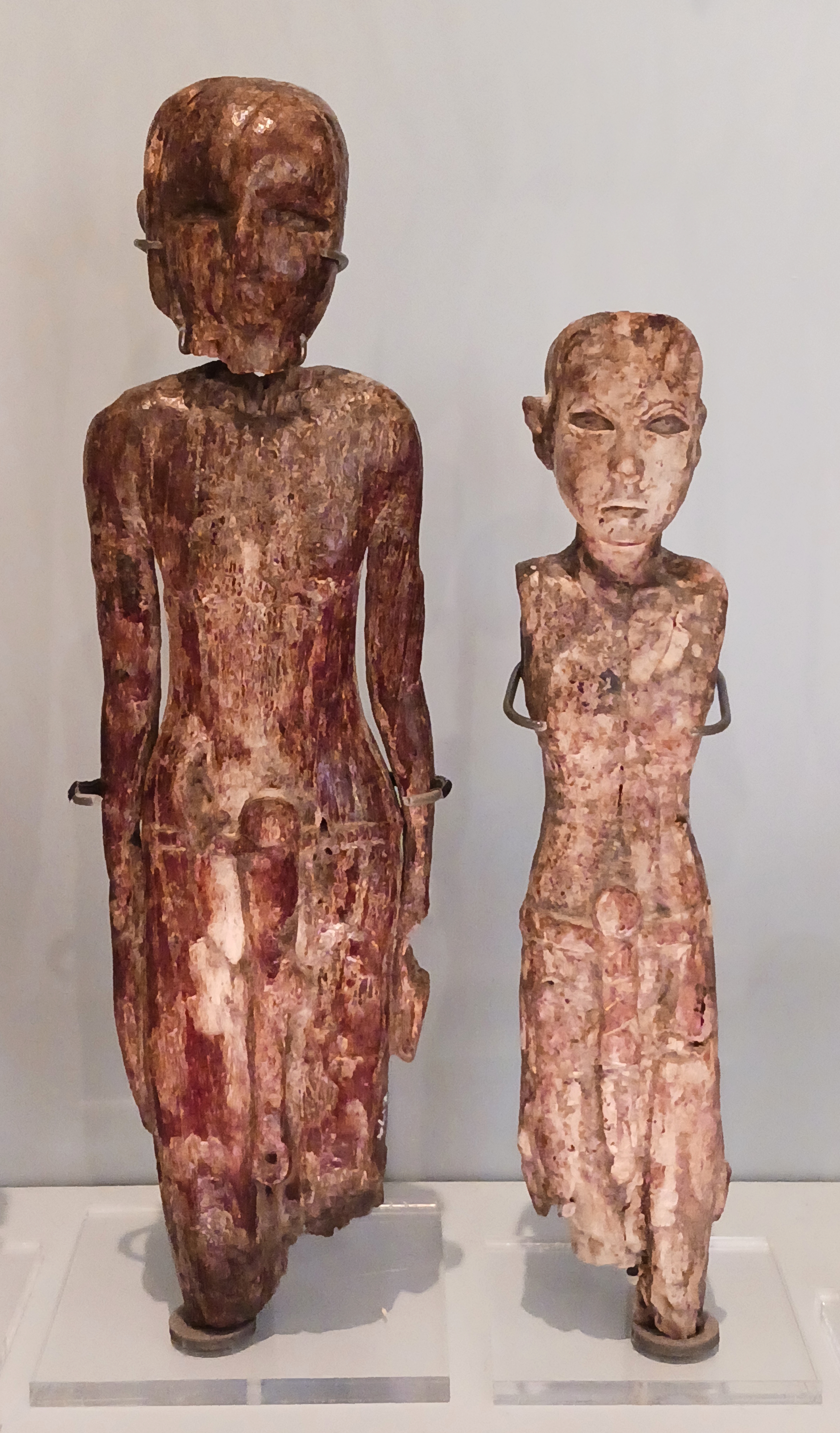
Male statuettes with penile sheaths, Hierakonpolis. Late Predynastic, Naqada III (3300–3000 BC) – Early Dynastic, Dynasty I (3000–2890 BC).

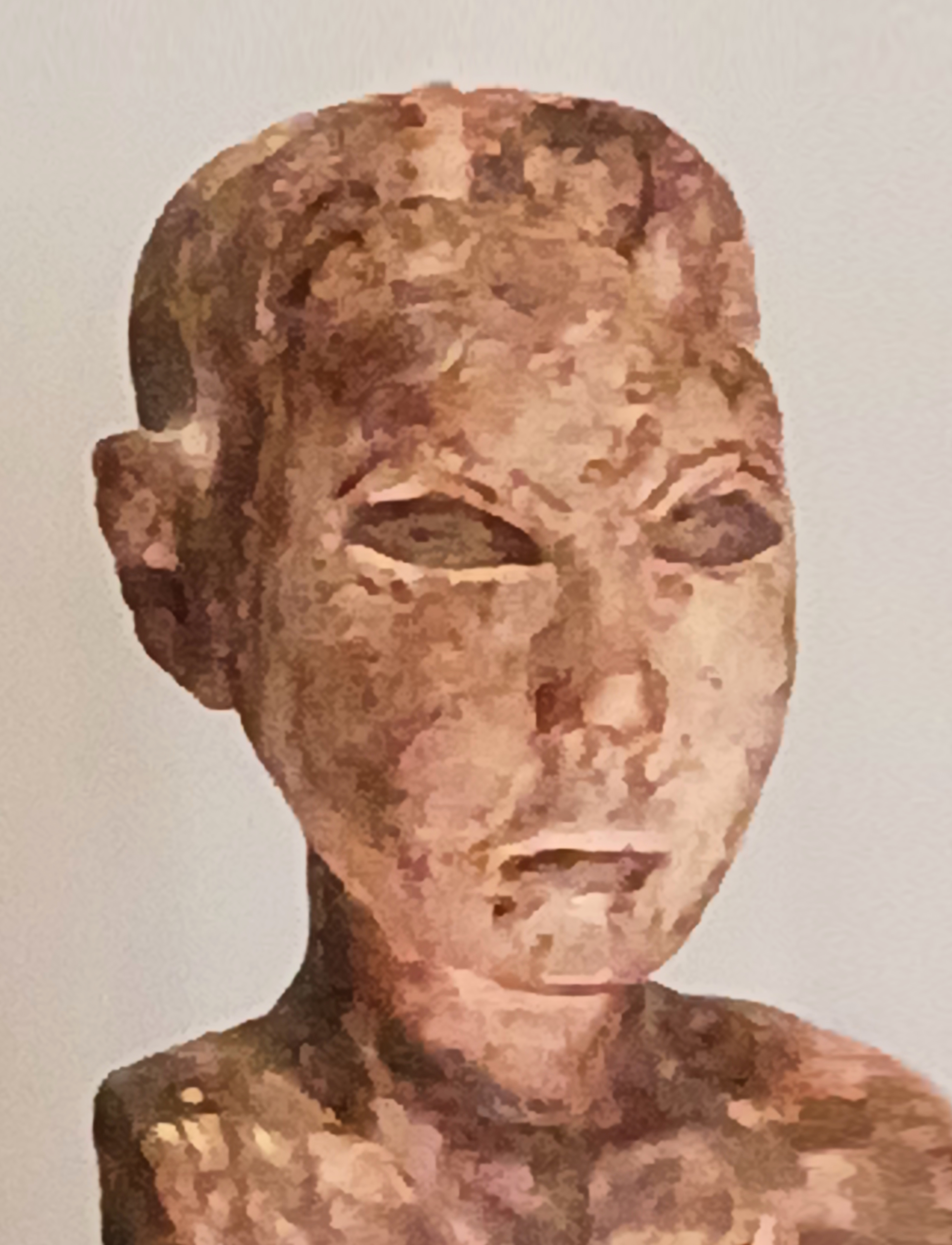
Male portrait, Hierakonpolis. Late Predynastic, Naqada III (3300–3000 BC) – Early Dynastic, Dynasty I (3000–2890 BC). Ashmolean Museum.

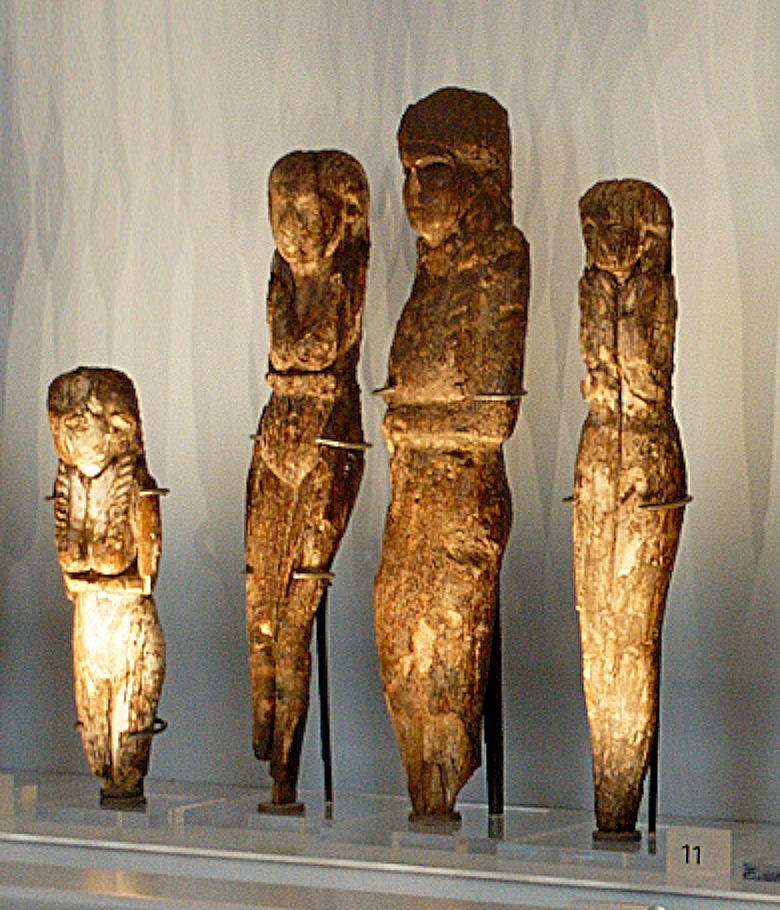
Female statuettes, Hierakonpolis. Late Predynastic, Naqada III (3300–3000 BC) – Early Dynastic, Dynasty I (3000–2890 BC).

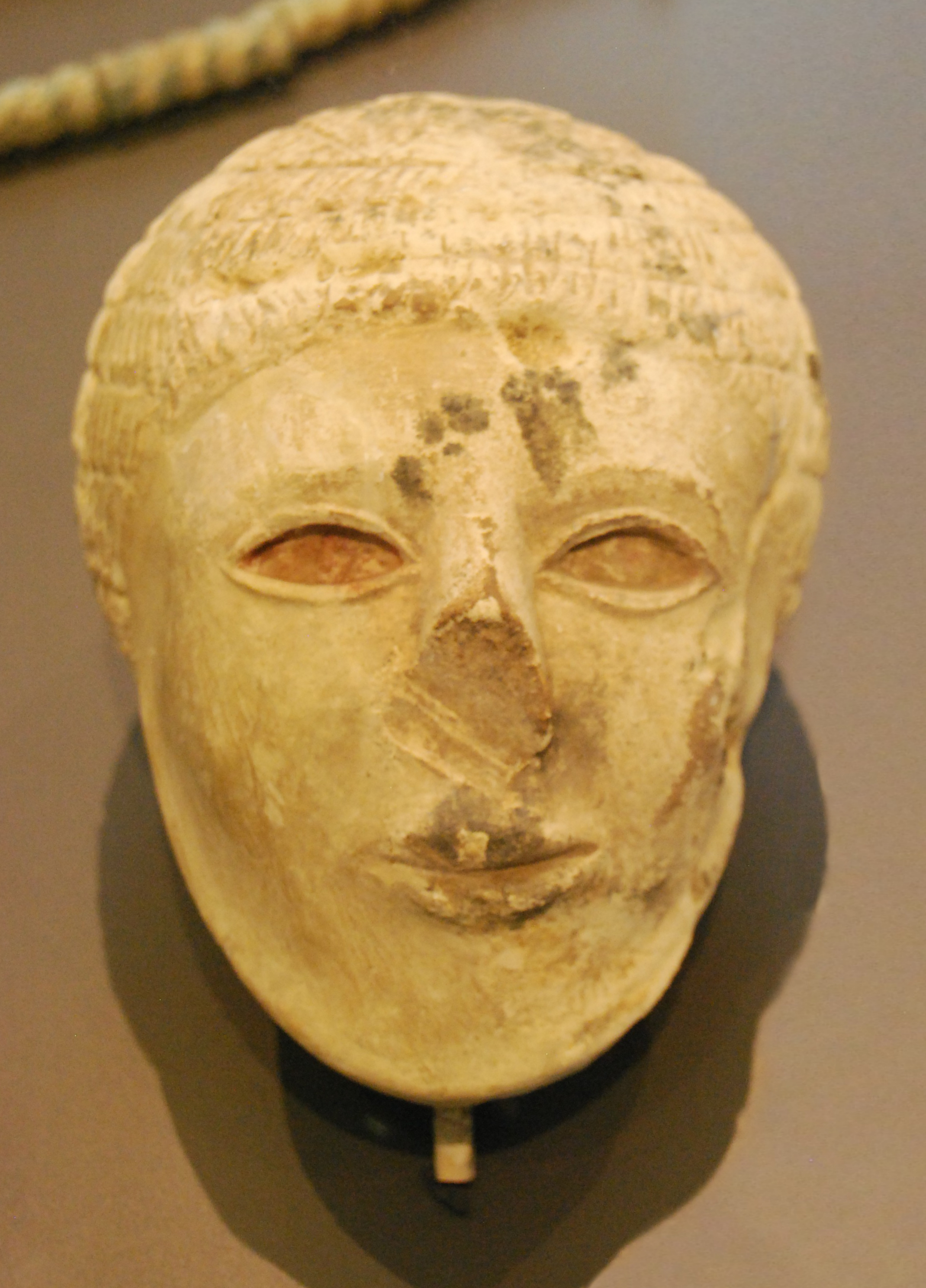
Human figurine from the main deposit at Nekhen, Naqada III period. Ashmolean Museum, E.294.

== See also ==
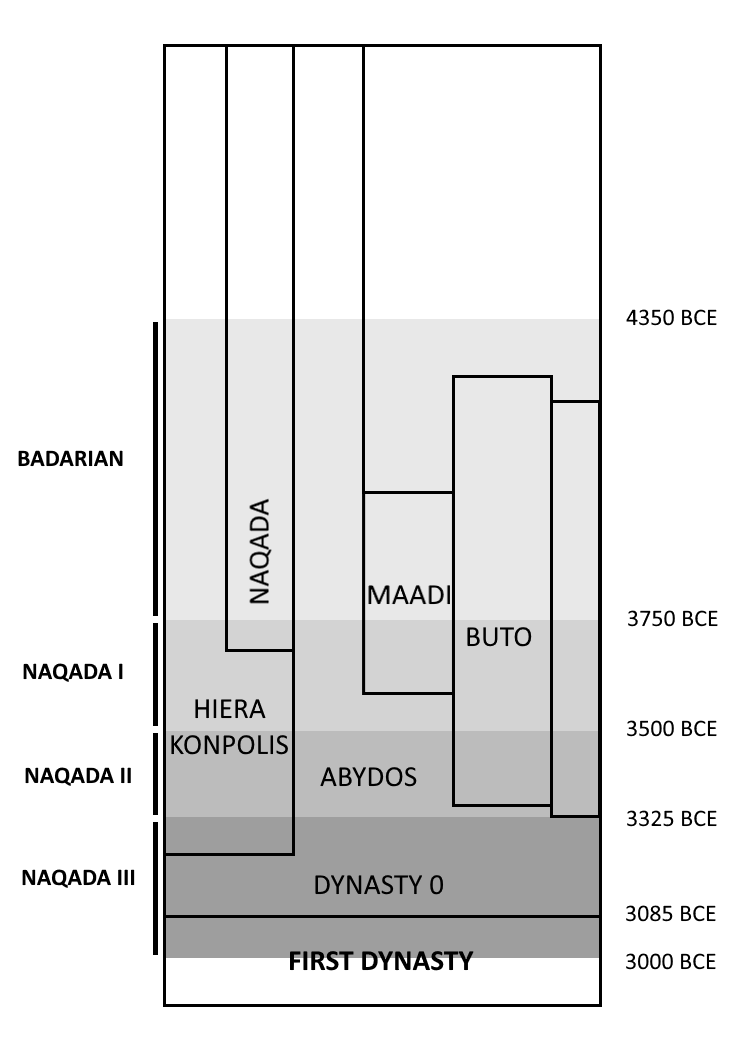
Chronology of state formation in Ancient Egypt.

- Badarian culture
- Early Dynastic Egypt
- First Dynasty of Egypt
- List of Pharaohs
- Naqada culture
- Scorpion II
- Scorpion Macehead
- Tell el-Farkha

== Sources ==
- Dee, Michael W.; Wengrow, David; Shortland, Andrew J.; Stevenson, Alice; Brock, Fiona; Bronk Ramsey, Christopher (June 2014). "Radiocarbon dating and the Naqada relative chronology". Journal of Archaeological Science. 46. doi:10.1016/j.jas.2014.03.016.
- Patch, Diana Craig; Eaton-Krauss, Marianne (2011). Dawn of Egyptian art. New York : New Haven: Metropolitan Museum of Art; Distributed by Yale University Press. ISBN 978-0300179521.
