= Taurus (ruler) =

Predynastic Egyptian king with disputed existence

- Bull

Pharaoh
- Reign: Unknown, existence disputed
- Predecessor: Stork (pharaoh)
- Successor: Scorpion I ?
Royal titulary
Horus name
E1
- Burial: Unknown
- Dynasty: Dynasty 0

Taurus or Bull is the provisional name for a Predynastic Egyptian ruler whose historicity is disputed. He is considered a ruler of the late Chalcolithic Naqada III culture of southern Egypt. If "Taurus" or "Bull" actually represents a ruler's name, it is mainly known from ivory tablets from the Abydos tomb U-j of Umm El Qa'ab and from a rock carving on the Gebel Tjauti mountain.

== Attestations ==
Egyptologist Günter Dreyer deduced the existence of King "Taurus" from incisions on a statue of the god Min, which he interpreted as line of succession. He suspected that the grave goods, which were intended for King Scorpion I, came from the state domain goods of King "Taurus" and thus the bull symbol originated from the name of the latter.

Further evidence of the existence of this ruler is the interpretation of a rock drawing discovered in 2003 on the Gebel Tjauti in the desert west of Thebes. It apparently represents a successful campaign by King Scorpion I against King Taurus. This battle was possibly part of the concentration of power in late prehistoric Egypt: Scorpion I, operating from Thinis, conquered Taurus' realm in the Naqada area.

=== Unclear meaning of early hieroglyphs ===
However, since the bull sign is never accompanied by a horus falcon or a gold rosette – indicators of rulers in the pre-dynastic period – some researchers doubt that it refers to a king. For example, the writing expert Ludwig David Morenz and the Egyptologist Jochem Kahl point out that Egyptian hieroglyphic writing was still in the early stages of development during the pre-dynastic period and that it was extremely unsafe to assign individual pictorial symbols. The reason for this is the fact that in this early writing development phase no fixed determinatives for "locality", "nomes" and "region" existed. A representation of a bull could represent the king as an attacking force, but it could also be part of a name for a certain place or district (e.g. for the mountain bull district). There were also depictions of bulls in connection with the archaic ceremony "Catching the wild bull" as a pre-form for the later Apis run. A bull representation therefore does not necessarily confirm a king's name.
