= Scorpion I =

Predynastic Egyptian king

- Weha, Serk
- Carving from Gebel Tjauti (known as the Scorpion Tableau). The red arrow points to the Proto-Hieroglyph/artistic depiction of Scorpion I.

Pharaoh
- Reign: c. 3300 BC?
- Predecessor: Taurus ? owner of tomb U-k ?
- Successor: Double Falcon ? owner of tomb U-i ? Crocodile? Later on Iry-Hor
Royal titulary
Horus name
Weha / Serk
Wḥˁ / Srq
Scorpion ?
- Burial: Tomb U-j, Umm El Qa'ab, Abydos
- Dynasty: Dynasty 0

Scorpion I (fl. c. 3380 - 3230 BC (Note: This study gives five calibrated results for Tomb U-j, believed to be Scorpion I's tomb, being 3490-3470 BC, 3380-3330 BC, 3310-3230 BC, 3180-3160 BC, and 3120-3030 BC.)) was a ruler of Upper Egypt during Naqada III. He was one of the first rulers of Ancient Egypt, and a graffito of him depicts a battle with an unidentified predynastic ruler. His tomb is known for the evidence of early examples of wine consumption in Ancient Egypt.

== Tombs ==
Scorpion is believed to have lived in Thinis and was presumably the first true king of Upper Egypt. To him belongs the U-j tomb found in the royal cemetery of Abydos, where Thinite kings were buried. That tomb was plundered in antiquity, but in it were found many small ivory plaques, each with a hole for tying it to something, and each marked with one or more hieroglyph-type scratched images which are thought to be names of towns, perhaps to tie the offerings and tributes to keep track of which came from which town. Two of those plaques seem to name the towns Baset and Buto, showing that Scorpion's armies had penetrated the Nile Delta. It may be that the conquests of Scorpion started the Egyptian hieroglyphic system by stimulating a need to keep records in a written form.

== Battle depiction ==
In 1995, a 5,000-year-old graffito was discovered in the Theban Desert Road Survey that also bears the symbols of Scorpion and depicts his victory over another protodynastic ruler (possibly Naqada's king). The defeated king or place named in the graffito was a marking also found in U-j; the name was "Bull's Head", very likely referring to Taurus (Bull). It is believed that Scorpion I unified Upper Egypt following the defeat of Naqada's king, meaning Nekhen's royal house had submitted itself into a union with King Scorpion I in Thinis.

== Evidence of wine consumption ==
Scorpion's tomb is known in archaeological circles for its possible evidence of ancient wine consumption. In a search of the tomb, archaeologists discovered dozens of imported ceramic jars containing a yellow residue consistent with wine, dated to around 3150 BC. Chemical residues of herbs, tree resins, and other natural substances were found in the jars. Grape seeds, skins and dried pulp were also found in the tomb.

== Notes ==
Preceded by Bull?	Pharaoh of Egypt	Succeeded by Iry-Hor?
