= Elephant (pharaoh) =

Provisional name of the first known predynastic Egypt ruler (existence disputed)

- Pen-Abw, Pen-Abu
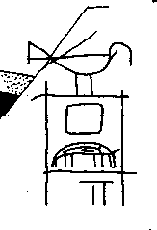
- Rock inscription from Qustul

Pharaoh
- Reign: Naqada III
- Predecessor: Unknown
- Successor: Stork
Royal titulary
Horus name
(Hor) Pen-Abu
Pn-3bw
Great one from the (throne) seat
| G5 | Q3 E26 |
- Burial: unknown
- Dynasty: Predynastic Egypt

Elephant (maybe read as Pen-Abu; fl. c. 3100 BCE) is the provisional name of a Predynastic ruler in Egypt. Since the incarved rock inscriptions and ivory tags showing his name are either drawn sloppily, or lacking any royal crest, the reading and thus whole existence of king "Elephant" is highly disputed.

== Identity ==
The proposed existence of Elephant is based on Günter Dreyer's and Ludwig David Morenz's essays. They are convinced that Elephant was a local king who ruled at the region of Qustul. According to Dreyer, Elephant's name appears in incised rock inscriptions at Qustul and Gebel Sheikh-Suleiman, where the hieroglyphs are put inside a royal serekh. On ivory tags found at Abydos, the Elephant appears without any other royal crest. Dreyer sees a cube-shaped throne seat and a walking elephant beneath it and reads Pen-Abu ("Great one from the (throne) seat"). Morenz thinks alike but is highly uncertain about the reading of the name. He prefers to use the neutral provisional name "King Elephant". Alternatively, he proposes a rhinoceros as a royal animal. Morenz points out that it became a remarkable fashion during the Naqada III epoch to choose dangerous and unpredictable animals (such as lions, crocodiles, elephants and rhinoceroses) for building up royal names.

Other Egyptologists, such as Peter Kaplony and Toby Wilkinson, are not so sure and propose different readings. Whilst Wilkinson sees a throne seat and the hieroglyph for "border", Kaplony sees a seat and a stand full of wine jars, the sign for "praised". Kaplony also mentions that the name of a certain 1st-dynasty palatinate named Hor-Sekhentydjw was also written with the wine-jar holder symbol. He believes that the name of the palatinate was created out of King Elephant's name.

== Reign ==
Elephant might have ruled during the early Naqada III epoch. His tomb is unknown.

== See also ==
- List of pharaohs
