= Stork (pharaoh) =

Ancient Egyptian ruler (pharaoh)

Pharaoh
- Reign: ? - Likely never existed.
- Predecessor: Pen-Abu
- Successor: Taurus
Royal titulary
Horus name
Stork
G29
- Dynasty: Naqada III

Stork may have been an ancient Egyptian ruler (pharaoh) from the pre-dynastic period of Egypt. Most modern scholars, however, doubt that he ever existed.

Very little is known of his rule due to a scarcity of archeological evidence and a lack of written records. The dates and geographic extent of his rule are not known. His actual name is unknown though he used the stork hieroglyph to denote himself.
