= Penis sheath =

Penis sheath may refer to:

- Koteka, a New Guinean piece of clothing
- Namba (clothing), a Ni-Vanuatu piece of clothing
- Penile sheath, a non-human mammal foreskin
- Willy warmer, a novelty piece of clothing
