= Fish (pharaoh) =

Predynastic pharaoh of Upper Egypt (disputed)

Pharaoh
- Reign: Unknown, likely never existed
- Predecessor: Unknown
- Successor: Unknown
- Dynasty: Dynasty 0

Fish was thought to be a ruler of the Lower Egypt or a part of Lower Egypt during the late prehistoric period. He most likely never existed and is a modern invention due to misunderstanding of early hieroglyphic signs. Fish is known only from the fish hieroglyph and was possibly a king of the prehistoric Dynasty 0 of Predynastic Egypt.

Fish is thought to have ruled late in the 31st century BC.

He is known only from artefacts that bear his mark, a hieroglyphic fish symbol. The dates and geographic extent of his rule are not known nor is his actual name.
