= Finger Snail =

Possible Ancient Egyptian king

Pharaoh
- Reign: Uncertain, possibly never existed
- Predecessor: Unknown
- Successor: Unknown
- Consort: Unknown
- Children: Unknown
- Dynasty: Dynasty 0

Pharaoh Finger Snail was an ancient Egyptian ruler from the pre-dynastic period of prehistoric Egypt. It is disputed whether he really existed as the reading of his name as a king's name is far from certain. Most scholars do not read the known signs as a king's name. He may have been the first king of a united upper Egypt.
