= Gebel Tjauti =

Rock formation in Egypt

Coordinates: 25°52′09″N 32°32′33″E

Gebel Tjauti is a rock formation in Egypt. The rock is named after Tjauti, an ancient Egyptian official who lived at the end of the Eighth Dynasty, around 2150 BC.

The rock is known for a series of rock inscriptions known as the Gebel Tjauti rock inscriptions, discovered by the Theban Desert Road Survey.

The inscriptions are today much destroyed, but gave rise for some speculation as some fights seems to be mentioned. The inscription seems to report the opening of a road. Close to this inscription was found another one naming a king Intef and the assault of soldiers. The publication of the inscription sees a connection between these two inscriptions and identifies Intef, with Intef I.

== See also ==
- Wadi el-Hôl, another site in the Western Desert with rock inscriptions
