= Kamil Crater =

Meteorite impact crater in New Valley Governorate, Egypt

- Radon crater
- Location within Africa
- Location: Egypt; 22°01′06″N 26°05′16″E

Impact crater structure
- Confidence: Confirmed
- Diameter: 44.8 m (147 ft)
- Impactor diameter: one point three m (4 ft 3.2 in)
- Age: < 5 Ka

Location of the Kamil Crater in Egypt

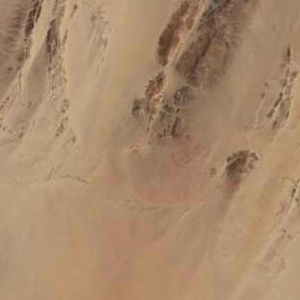
Landsat image centered on the crater, showing the ray system. Image width approximately 9 km.

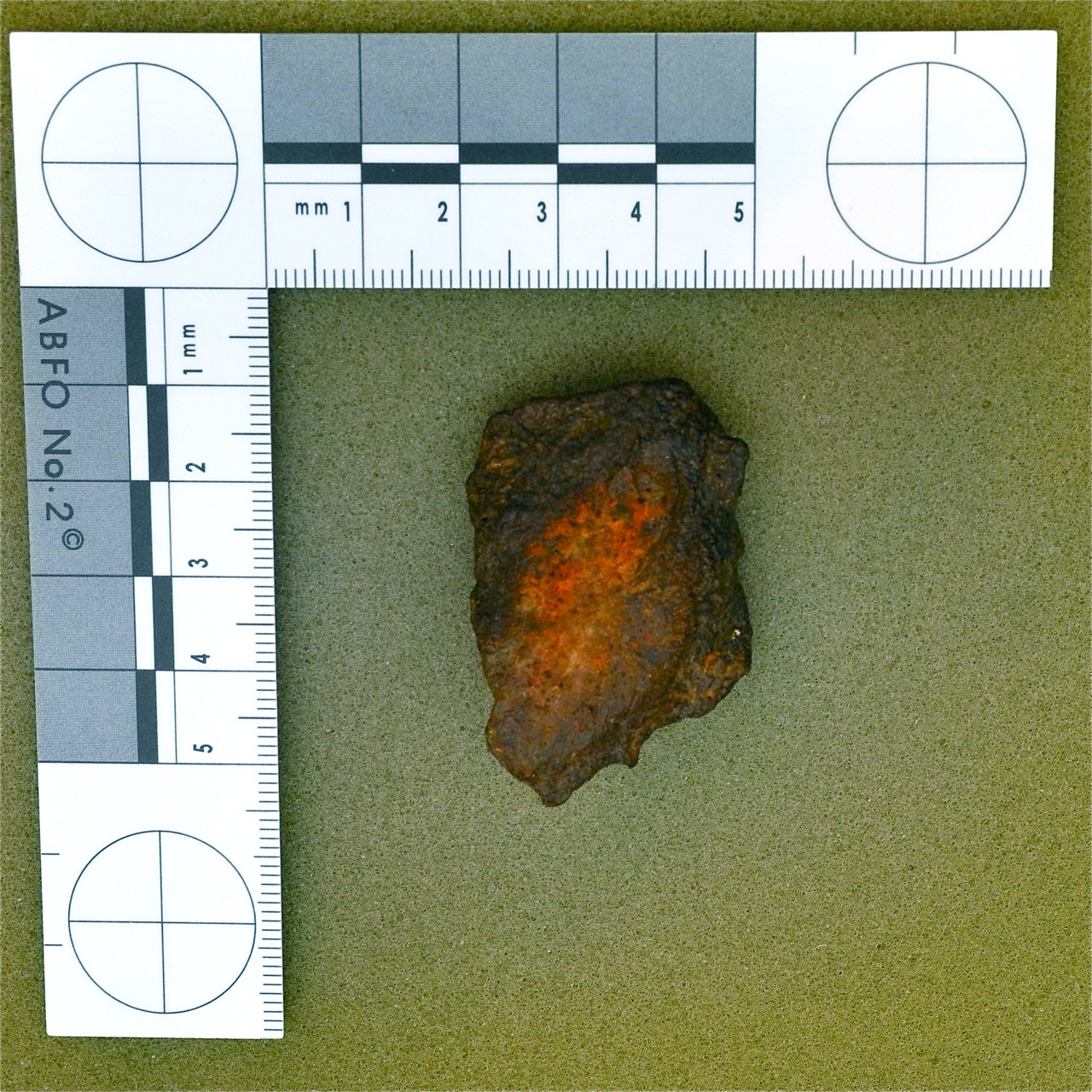
A 60-gram fragment of the Gebel Kamil meteorite. The discoloration demonstrates the weathering of the iron due to its prolonged exposure to the elements.

The Kamil Crater is a 44.8-metre-wide (147 ft) and 15.8-metre-deep (52 ft) (original depth, a part covered by sand at present) meteorite impact crater in the East Uweinat Desert in southwestern New Valley Governorate, Egypt, only 0.6 km (0.4 mi) north of the border with the Sudan and 600 m (2,000 ft) above sea level. It was located in 2008 using Google Earth satellite imagery by Vincenzo de Michele (former curator of the Museo Civico di Storia Naturale di Milan in Milan, Italy). It is one of the few craters on Earth with a well-preserved ray system.

== Studies ==
The first geophysical study of the Kamil Crater was conducted during an Italian-Egyptian expedition undertaken in February 2010 as part of the 2009 Egyptian-Italian Science Year (EISY) and proved the meteoritic origin of the crater. It is estimated to be less than 5,000 years old and shows a well-preserved rayed structure. The crater was produced by an iron meteorite that has been given an official name after the closest topographic feature in the area, Gebel Kamil, and which fragmented into thousands of pieces upon impact with the sandstone bedrock. The meteor is estimated to have been 1.3 metres (4.3 ft) wide and to have weighed 5,000 to 10,000 kilograms (10,000 to 20,000 lb). Meteor fragments totalling 800 kilograms (1,800 lb) were recovered during the geophysical expedition, the bulk of which are curated at the Egyptian Geological Museum in Cairo. Type specimens also are curated at the Museo Nazionale dell'Antartide at the University of Siena, and at the Museo di Storia Naturale at the University of Pisa.

Kamil Crater is located at 22° 1'5.89"N latitude and 26° 5'15.69"E longitude.

== See also ==
- Gebel Kamil (Meteorite)
- 2008 TC3
