= Tell el-Murra =

Archaeological site in Egypt

- Location within Egypt
- 30°53′00″N 31°53′00″E
- Type: settlement
- Periods: Late Chalcolithic, Early Bronze Age
- Location: Sharqia Governorate, Egypt

History
- Built: Middle 4th millennium BC

Site notes
- Excavation dates: 2008, 2010-present
- Archaeologists: Mariusz A. Jucha, Grzegorz Bąk-Pryc
- Condition: Ruined
- Owner: Public
- Public access: Yes

Tell el-Murra is an ancient archaeological site in the eastern Nile Delta in the Sharqia Governorate of Egypt lying about 120 kilometers northeast of Cairo. It lies 1 kilometer to the south of the modern village of Abu Umran, and roughly 10 kilometers east of Tell el-Farkha. The ancient name of the site is unknown. It was occupied from about 3500 BC until about 2200 BC encompassing the Naqada III Culture, which includes the Protodynastic and Early Dynastic periods (1st–2nd dynasty), and was then abandoned after the Old Kingdom period (3rd through Sixth Dynasty). Lower Egyptian Culture, c. 3500 BC, remains were found in one trench and no remains from the intervening Naqada II period were found. The nearby sites of Tell el-Akhdar, Tell Gezira el-Faras, Tell Abu el-Halyat, Minshat Radwan, and Ezbet el-Tell/Kufur Nigm were also surveyed and found to have been occupied in the Naqada III period as well.

== Archaeology ==
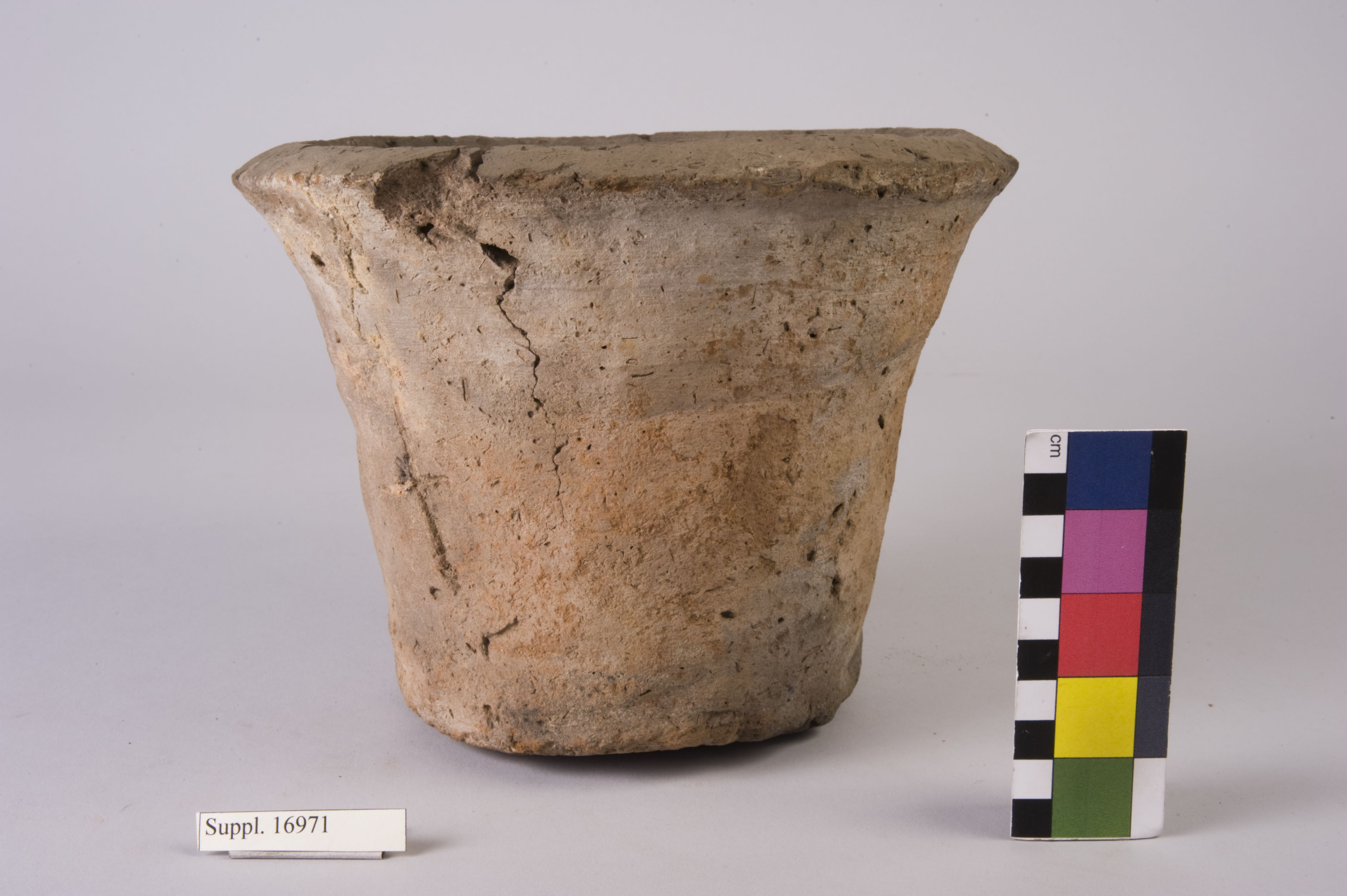
Old Kingdom bread mould found at Gebelein Egypt

Tell el-Murra rises to a height of 3 to 4 meters and is so far relatively undamaged by agricultural activity. The mound measures 250 meters from north to south and 180 meters east to west with a total an area of about 4.5 hectares. A cemetery lies in the southwestern part of the and settlement activity has been found in the northern, eastern and south-eastern part of the mound. In the 1980s the Amsterdam University Survey Expedition in the area noted Old Kingdom surface pottery at the site.Following a regional survey season in 2008 excavations at Tell el-Murra began in 2010 by a Institute of Archaeology of Jagiellonian University in Kraków team under the direction of Mariusz A. Jucha and Grzegorz Bąk-Pryc. A few years before that a roughly 40 meter by 80 meter trench was excavated by Egyptian archaeologist in the northeastern part of the tell but it appears to be undocumented. A total of over 300 square meters have been excavated.

=== Finds ===
In the settlement area (primarily trench S3 and trench T5) Early Dynastic and Old Kingdom levels a large number of bread moulds were found, many with pre-firing potmarks. A few were also found in funerary contexts (mainly Early Dynastic graves 33, 39, 40, and 42). The shape of bread moulds evolved over time in Egypt, from broad and shallow in the Naqada IIIA-B period through the inverted bell shape of the Old Kingdom. Those at Tell el-Murra were produced from Nile clay, sand, and straw and were poorly fired, being disposable. Potmarks were also found on some very tall wine jars, very tall jars with broad shoulders, medium-sized ovoid jars, small jars with broad shoulders, bowls and very small jars. Over 600 flint artifacts, many fragmentary, were recovered from the Early Dynastic layers. These were mostly blades for use as sickles and in tools like razor blades, bifacial flint knives, scrapers, and perforators. A few fragments of armbands were also found.

=== Settlement ===
The largest settlement remains are from the 3rd and 4th Dynasty period with 3 large complexes being built (structures on a north-west, south-east orientation) separated by pathways. Two meter wide silos, used in food storage, were found in some rooms. In others numerous bread moulds and signs of burning were found. The settlement appears to have developed organically rather than being a planned development.

=== Cemetery ===
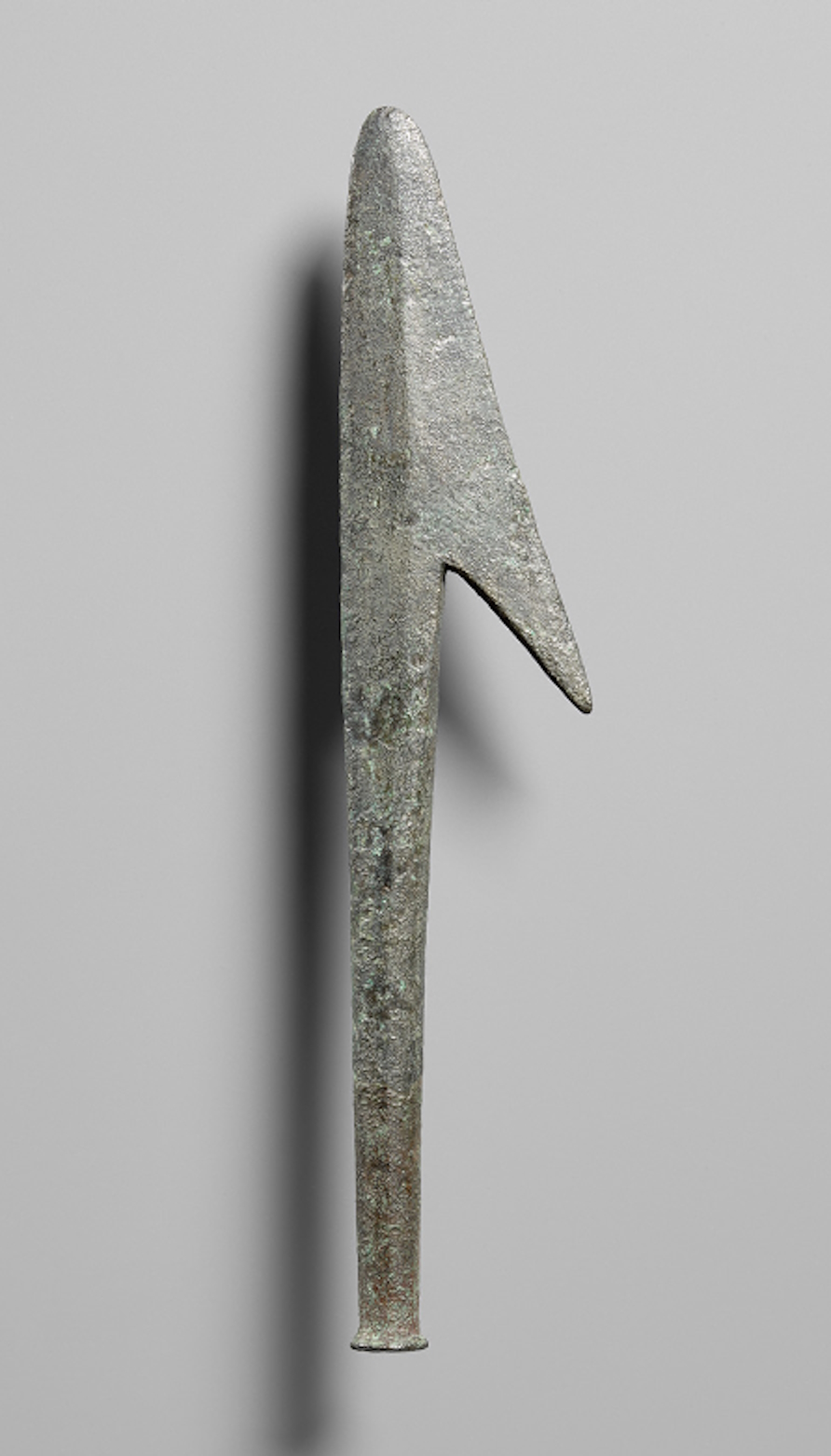
Example of a Naqada III period Copper harpoon tip from another site

The Naqada III through Early Dynastic periods cemetery in the southwestern part of the site consisted of about 40 burials to date. These were in the form of simple pits and one chambered or two-chambered graves. So far about 40 burials have been excavated dating to Naqada IIIB-C1, Naqada IIIC2, Naqada IIIC, Naqada IIIC2/D, and Naqada IIID (Dynasty 0 through Dynasty 2) and an area of over 5 acres excavated. The full extent of the cemetery is not yet known. Grave goods were mostly pottery and stone vessels however a few flint knives, stone or bone bracelets, and beads were also found. Pottery types include beer jars and wine jars. Beer jars a named from their appearance matching those in Old Kingdom art depicting what is assumed to be beer drinking. Beer Jars found at Tell el-Murra dated to the Naqada IIIB–C2/D and Naqada IIIIC2/D periods. The most notable grave goods were two copper harpoons, dated by associated pottery to the Naqada IIIC1 period. Similar harpoons were found at nearby Tell el-Farkha. ten of the burials were in pottery coffins, one being of the bathtub type. Some were lidded and some were unlidded. Pottery coffins are very rare at similar sites of this period.

== History ==
The site was first settled in the Lower Egyptian Culture period, show by the discovery of, post holes, storage pits and wooden wattle and daub constructions in two trenches. It then entered an occupational hiatus, after major Nil flooding destroyed much of the settlement, before being resettled on a larger scale in the Naqada III period which encompasses the Proto-Dynastic period and following Early Dynastic periods. After time of much reduced use it was fully settled again, albeit with a smaller footprint, in the Old Kingdom period, beginning in the 3rd Dynasty, before becoming abandoned permanently in the time of the Sixth Dynasty at the end of the Old Kingdom. During the Old Kingdom period the site appears to have been largely devoted to agricultural production and storage.

== See also ==
- Beveled rim bowls
- Dynasties of ancient Egypt
- Egyptian chronology
- Minshat Abu Omar
