= Egyptian Geological Museum =

Coordinates: 29.9963°N 31.2286°E

Egyptian Geological Museum المتحف الجيولوجي المصري
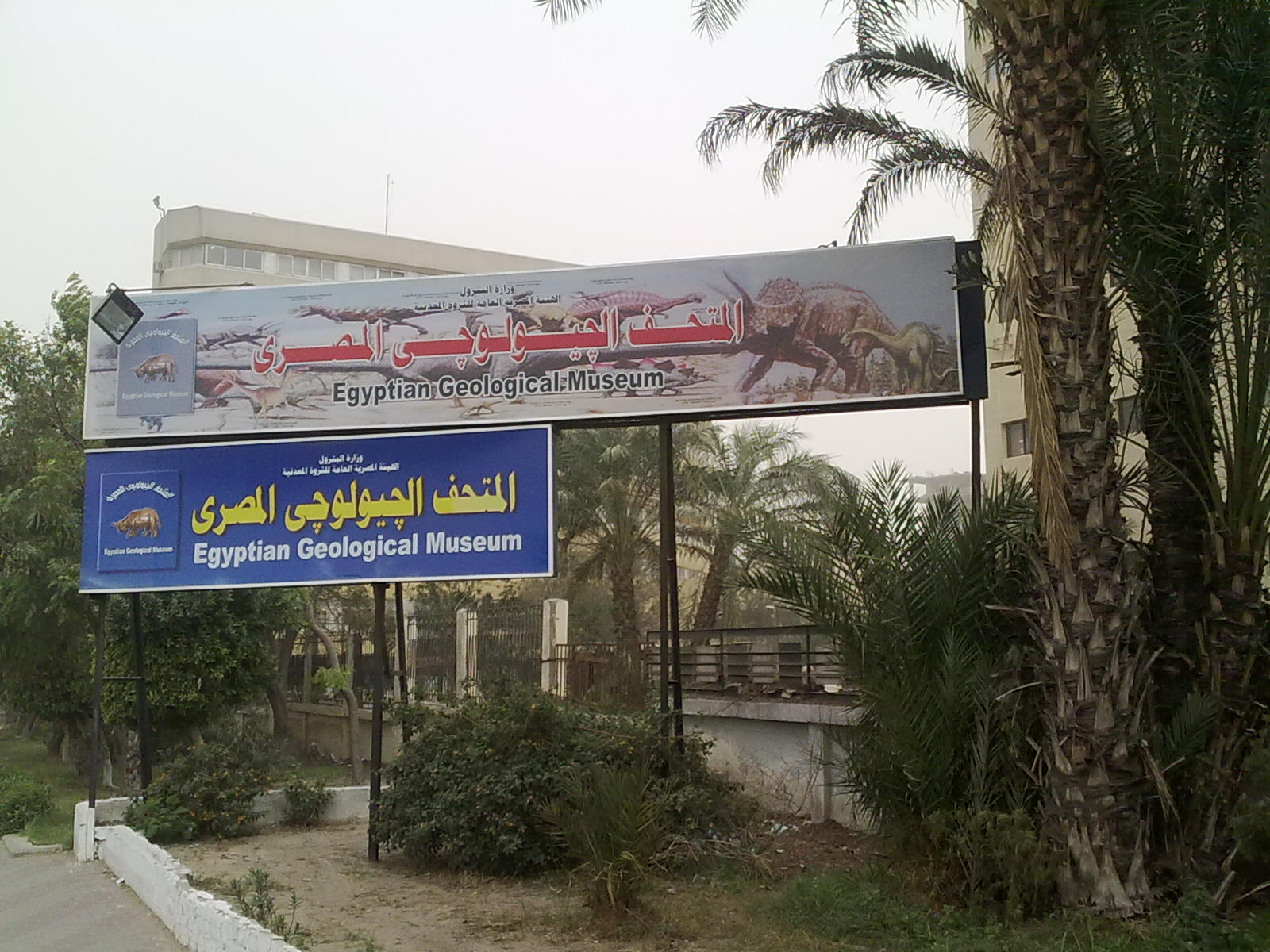
- Established: 1901
- Location: Maadi
- Type: Geological museum
- Website: Official website

The Egyptian Geological Museum is a museum in Cairo, Egypt. The museum was established in 1901 as part of the Egyptian Geological Survey, which had been started in 1896 under the direction of the Khedive Ismail. The museum was the first of its kind in the Middle East and the African continent.

== Museum history ==
The museum was initially housed in a Greco-Roman style building that was located in the gardens of the Ministry of Public Works in downtown Cairo; it was designed by Marcel Dourgnon, the French architect who had previously designed and constructed the Egyptian Museum (also known as the Museum of Egyptian Antiquities). This building had an exhibition hall with ceilings four metres (13 ft) high in order to accommodate the reconstructed fossil skeletons of paleontological finds, which included a three-metre-high (9.8 ft) ancestral elephant. The first Museum Keeper was William Andrews, a paleontologist from London's Natural History Museum, in 1904, who was followed by Henry Osborne in 1906.

During World War II, most of the important samples were buried in the sand so they wouldn't be damage if the area was bombed. After the war, the samples were sent back to the Geological Museum to be put on display.

The original museum was expanded in 1968 with the construction of an annex designed to house the museum's laboratories for petrology and paleontology. The museum remained there in downtown Cairo until 1982, when the original building was torn down to accommodate construction of the Cairo Metro.

== Present museum ==
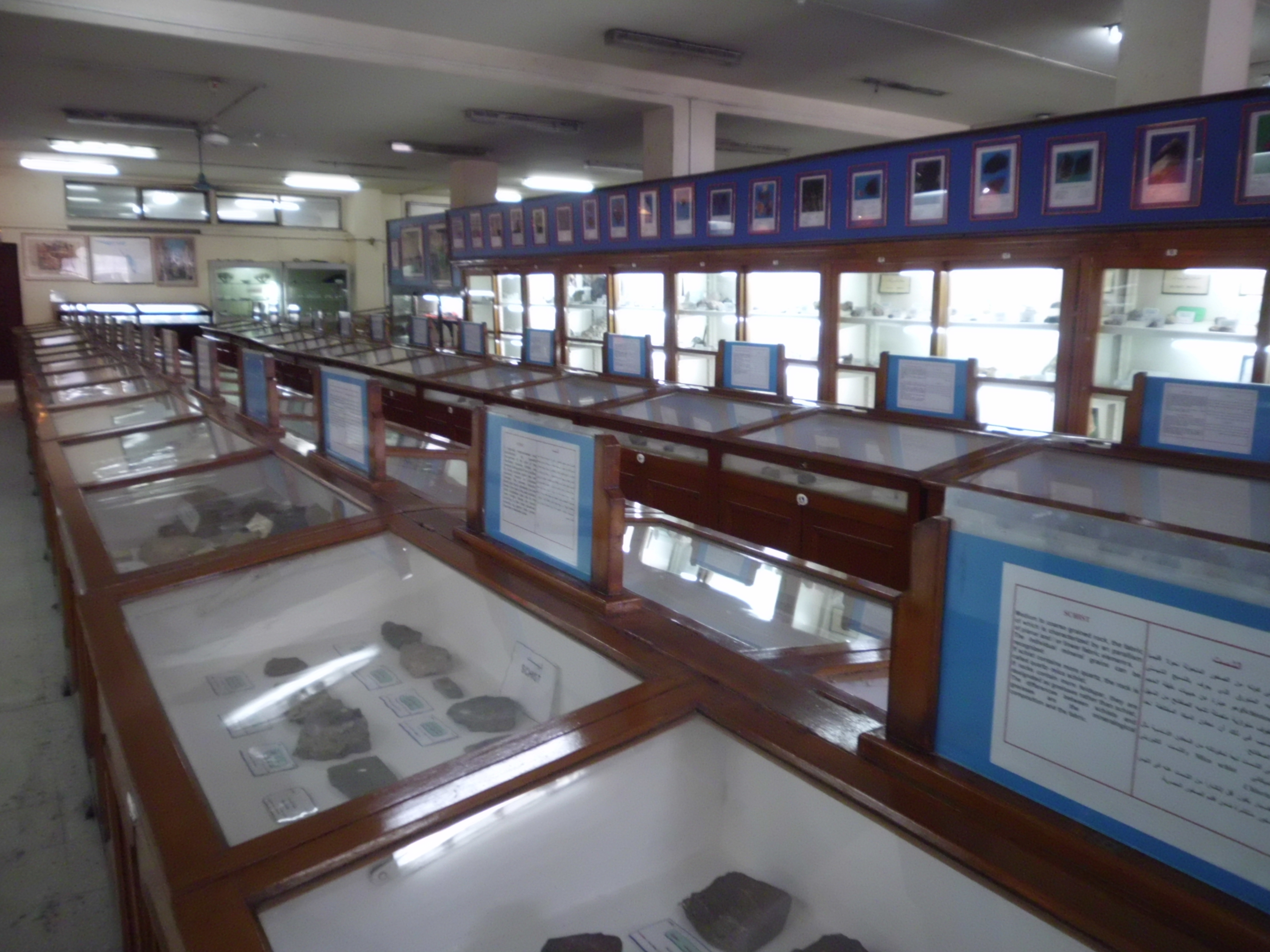
Museum interior at Maadi

The museum was transferred to its present location near Maadi, a southern suburb of Cairo.

On display are the Fayoum vertebrates, a series of fossils that had been unearthed in 1898 by geologist Hugh Beadnell at Qasr Al-Sagha to the north of Birqet Qarun in the Fayoum desert. These artifacts were sent to the British Museum for identification and returned to be displayed at the museum. The museum also includes examples of the natural history of Egypt, and how its geology and minerals helped make Egypt a world power.

Also in the museum's collection is the Nakhla meteorite, a Martian meteorite that fell at the village of El Nakhla El Baharia village in 1911, and is one of a very few meteorites known to have their origin in the planet Mars.

One of the main museum exhibitions is the set of type specimens from the Kamil iron meteorite, a huge iron meteorite that fell 2000–5000 years ago (3-4) to strike the sandstone bedrocks of the Cretaceous period, 1000 km southwest of Cairo. The huge kinetic energy that resulted from the meteorite collision with the ground created a medium-sized crater, 45 meters in diameter and 15 meters deep, as a result of a pushing-off the sandstone country rocks at the point of the impact.

The meteorite itself exploded and disrupted into thousands of fragments, ranging in size from minute millimeter-sized grains up to several centimeters. Both the meteoritic fragments and the sandstone chunks are distributed around the crater in more or less regular arms that extend 1 km from the crater center.

== Current events ==
The new Museum administration takes steps to develop the services of the museum. From January 2011 the museum staff began a monthly scientific report, each focused on one of the interesting museum exhibitions. Now there are comprehensive data on the Gebel Kamil meteorite, which represents one of the more interesting exhibitions in the museum, as well as Egyptian dinosaurs, and gemstones.

The museum organizes weekly public meetings to discuss the cultural and scientific interest of specific exhibitions.

During the latest government problems, while no visitor was allowed to enter the exhibition hall of the Museum, some objects of historical interest disappeared, including face of a Pharaonic statue made of basalt and a small Roman statue made of serpentine. This is mystery because there were no visitors to the museum at that time. This happened during the second month in office of the new director, who led immediately a comprehensive reform in the various sections of the museum. There were no troubles in the museum to account for this mystery. The Egyptian Military recovered all objects, except the small Roman statue.

== See also ==
- List of museums in Egypt
