= Maadi =

District in Cairo, Egypt

Maadi المعادى
- District

Egyptian Arabic transcription(s)
  - Common: El-Ma‛adi
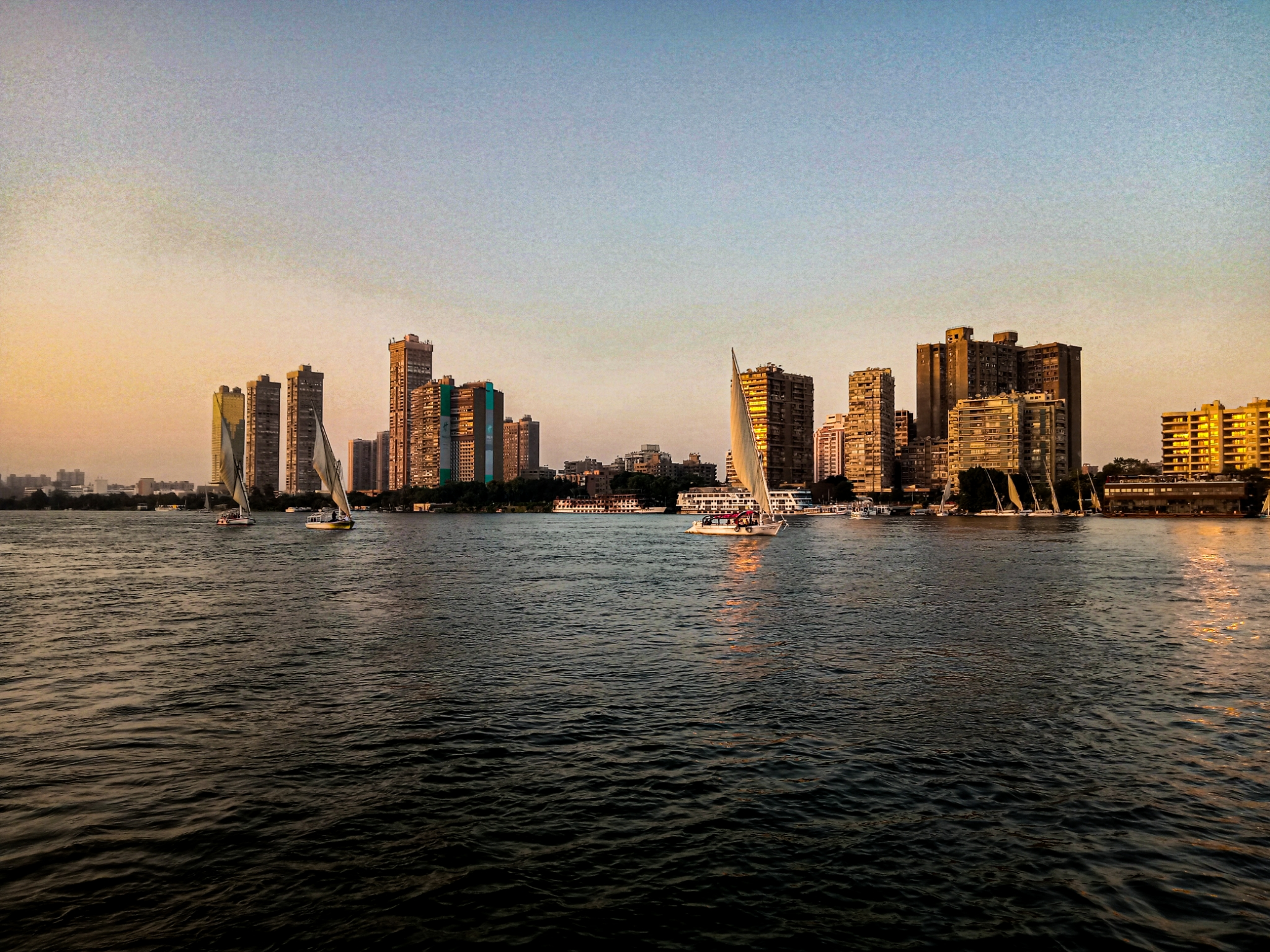
- View of the Nile Corniche in Maadi

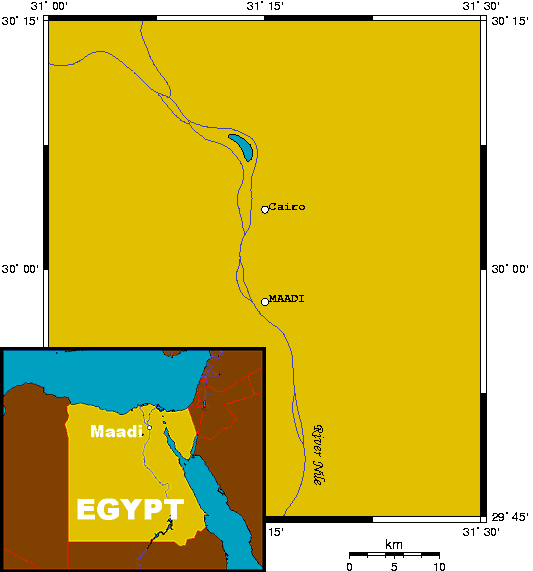
- Map of Maadi (inset: map of Egypt)

- Location of Maadi in Egypt
- Coordinates: 29°58′3″N 31°14′9″E
- Country: Egypt
- Governorate: Cairo
- First Settled: 4000BCE

Population (2023)
  - Total: 95,190
- Time zone: UTC+2 (EET)
  - Summer (DST): UTC+3 (EEST)

Maadi (Egyptian Arabic: المعادى el-Maʿādi [elmæˈʕæːdi]) is a leafy and once suburban district in the Southern Area of Cairo, Egypt, on the east bank of the Nile about 12 kilometers (7.5 mi) upriver from downtown Cairo. The modern extensions north-east and east of Maadi, New Maadi and Zahraa al-Maadi are administratively part of the Basatin district. The area has a history that streches back 6000 years.

The Nile in Maadi is paralleled by the Corniche, a waterfront promenade and the main road north into Cairo. There is no bridge across the Nile at Maadi; the nearest one is located at El Mounib along the Ring Road (Tarik El-Da'eri, English: The Round Road) on the way north to the downtown.

Maadi's population was estimated to be 85,000 according to the 2017 census. The district is popular with expatriates as well as Egyptians and is home to many embassies, as well as major international schools, sporting clubs, and cultural institutions such as the Supreme Constitutional Court of Egypt and the national Egyptian Geological Museum.

== Name ==
Maadi is the plural form of the word meʿaddeyya (معدية [meʕædˈdej.jæ]), which means "ferry"; hence, el-Maadi literally means "The ferries". The story goes that the name comes from a ferry crossing in the area where ferries carried people from the east side of the Nile to the west.

== History ==
Main page:See Buto-Maadi Culture

Maadi today stands on the site of a town that has turned out to be a significant predynastic, Ancient Egyptian archaeological site that includes artifacts from the Maadi-Buto culture, founded ca. 4000 B.C. The Culture was contemporary with Sumer, and represents Lower Egypt's earliest proto-state before being absorbed by the Naqada Culture before Egypt's Unification.

Building activity in the area has destroyed some archaeologically sensitive places.

The suburb holds deep Christian significance as one of the stops of the Holy Family's flight into Egypt, who embarked for Upper Egypt there. A church has been built on the site.

In Middle Ages the area of Maadi became a Coptic monastic region comprising Deir at-Tin (Arabic: دير الطين, Coptic: ⲡⲓⲙⲟⲛⲁⲥⲧⲉⲣⲓⲟⲛ ⲙ̀ⲡⲓⲟⲙⲓ, lit. 'monastery of mud') and Deir al-Adawiya (Arabic: دير العدوية, Coptic: ϯⲕⲁⲗⲁⲃⲏ).

Maadi traces its modern history to 1904, when the railway between Cairo to the north and Helwan to the south was built. This, in combination with land speculation by the Mosseri cousins and city planning by Alexander Adams, gave rise to a new town. Construction was originally limited to the area adjacent to the railway, but eventually spread west to the Nile. Also, a large British army camp was built east of the railway.

The town planning was done in 1905 by a Canadian retired officer, Captain Alexander J. Adams. His vision led to the wide streets and large villas still seen in Maadi today. There were very strict rules associated with residential development in Maadi with regards to the size of houses, how much of the property could be occupied by the house and how much had to be left for the garden, and the size of the sidewalks. Even window shutters had prescribed colours. Other regulations included wireless radio noise control after 22:00 and fines for not maintaining gardens properly.

Shuman sunengine in Maadi on the March 1916 cover of The Electrical Experimenter

The world's first solar thermal power station was built in Maadi.

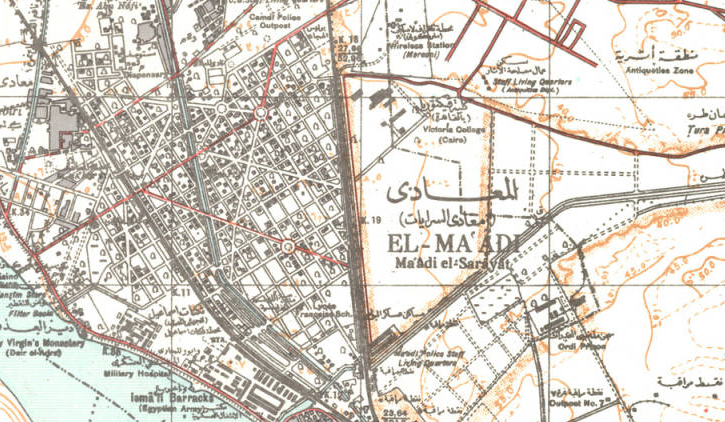
Map of Maadi, 1945 from the Survey of Egypt

An example of British colonial life in Maadi may be found in The house at Maadi, a short story by Gerald Bullett from his collection The street of the eye (1923).

=== Second World War ===
During the period between 1940 and 1945, Maadi had an important role in the Military of New Zealand during World War II. The Divisional Cavalry Regiment disembarked on 14 February 1940 and entrained for the New Zealand base camp at Maadi. In total around 76,000 members of the 2nd New Zealand Expeditionary Force trained at a camp near Maadi at the base of the desert slopes of Wadi Degla and Tel al-Maadi. During that time this area belonged to the Delta Land Company which created Maadi in 1907. The rocky plateau was leased to the New Zealand Military Forces, and for the next six years it became the central depot and training area for 2 NZEF in the Middle East.

A British Army interrogation centre was also located in Maadi. In July 1942, at the height of the Western Desert Campaign, two German spies revealed under questioning that they had been using a copy of Daphne du Maurier's Rebecca, found among their possessions, as a codebook for secret, coded radio transmissions. Their equipment, stored on a houseboat on the River Nile, had been examined by a young signals officer from the Egyptian Army, future President of Egypt Anwar Sadat.

=== Post-1952 revolution ===
Following the 1952 revolution (which ended the British occupation of the Suez Canal) and the 1956 Suez Crisis, in which Britain, France and Israel launched an invasion of Egypt to regain control of the canal, British and French expatriates living in Maadi and elsewhere were forced to leave by the Egyptian government. As a result, some of their institutions, such as St John's Anglican Church, were taken over and run temporarily by other nationalities.

== Administrative divisions and population ==
Maadi is a district in the Southern Area of Cairo, and is subdivided into five shiakhas (census blocks).

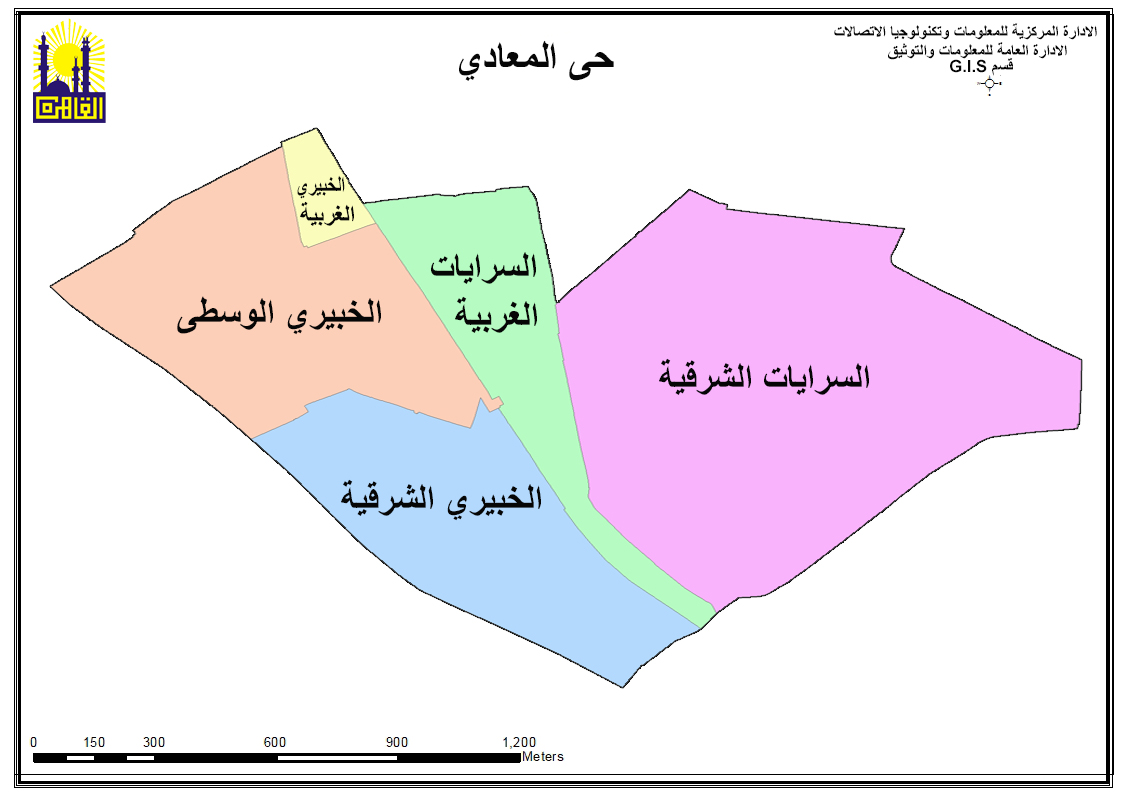

In the 2017 census Maadi had a total population of 108,575 people spread over the five shiakhas as follows:

Shiakha	Code 2017	Population
Ma`âdî al-Sarâyât al-sharqiyya	010604	25,177
Ma`âdî al-Sarâyât al-gharbiyya	010605	26,501
Ma`âdî al-Khabîrî al-wusṭä	010603	26,897
Ma`âdî al-Khabîrî al-sharqiyya	010601	7393
Ma`âdî al-Khabîrî al-gharbiyya	010602	2607

== Maadi today ==
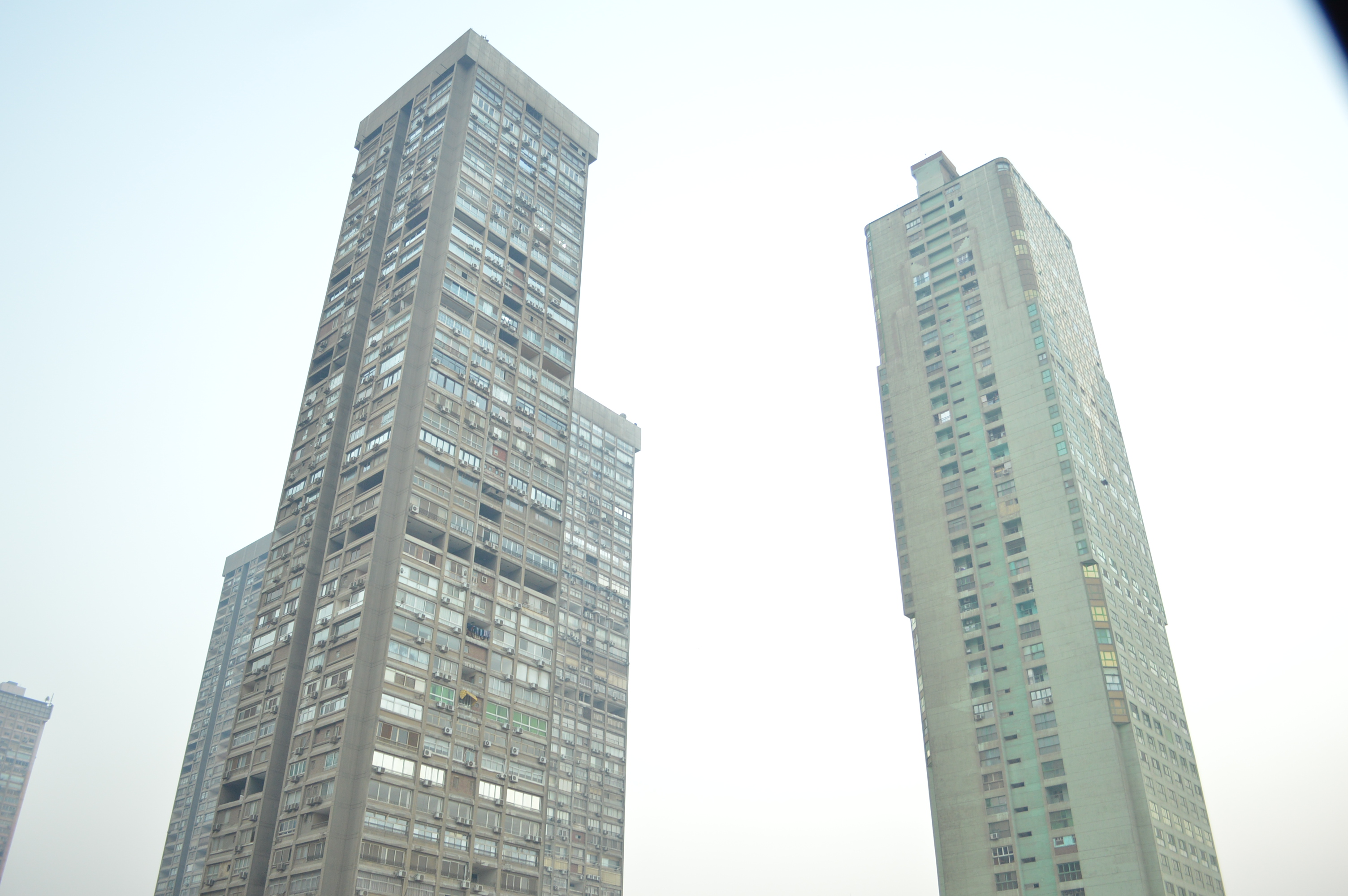
The Maadi towers

The oldest area in Maadi is El Sarayat, composed mostly of villas and low rise buildings. It is the most affluent part of Maadi along with the adjacent Degla area. These two areas are recognizable by the high number of roundabouts, quiet atmosphere and greenery.

There are many flats in Maadi, mostly in lowrise buildings. There are several highrises along the Corniche by the river, as well as in the newer, eastern part of Maadi, known as Degla.

The new Maadi areas include El-Laselky St. and the Autostrad, as well as Masaken El Arays, Saqr Kuraish and the houses of the Kuwaiti company, and El Basatin El Sharkya. which is between Saqr Kuraish and the houses of the Kuwait company. It is characterized by the large number of oil companies, most notably the Gulf of Suez Oil Company, as well as some other companies. The Arab region is also the most popular areas in Maadi and the Arab Maadi which is available from shops and crafts and various means of transport and its location, which connects all areas of Maadi.

Maadi is the highest densely populated district in Greater Cairo, and much of it is inhabited by well-to-do Egyptians, as well as expatriates, many of whom are connected with embassies, ambassadorial residences and international corporations located in Maadi. The Cairo office for the USAID is also located in Maadi.

Many streets in Maadi continue to have speed bumps as a traffic calming measure.

=== Atmosphere ===
Maadi has a reputation for being green, quieter and more relaxed than urban Cairo. In some parts of Maadi, most notably around Cairo American College, there is virtually no traffic noise. The abundant greenery bears little resemblance to most of the crowded areas seen in urban Cairo. This reputation is true of the original core of Maadi and Degla; however, outlying developments such as "New Maadi" have brought in the same treeless neighborhoods and mundane architecture as found in much of the rest of Cairo's metropolitan sprawl.

=== Economy and retail ===
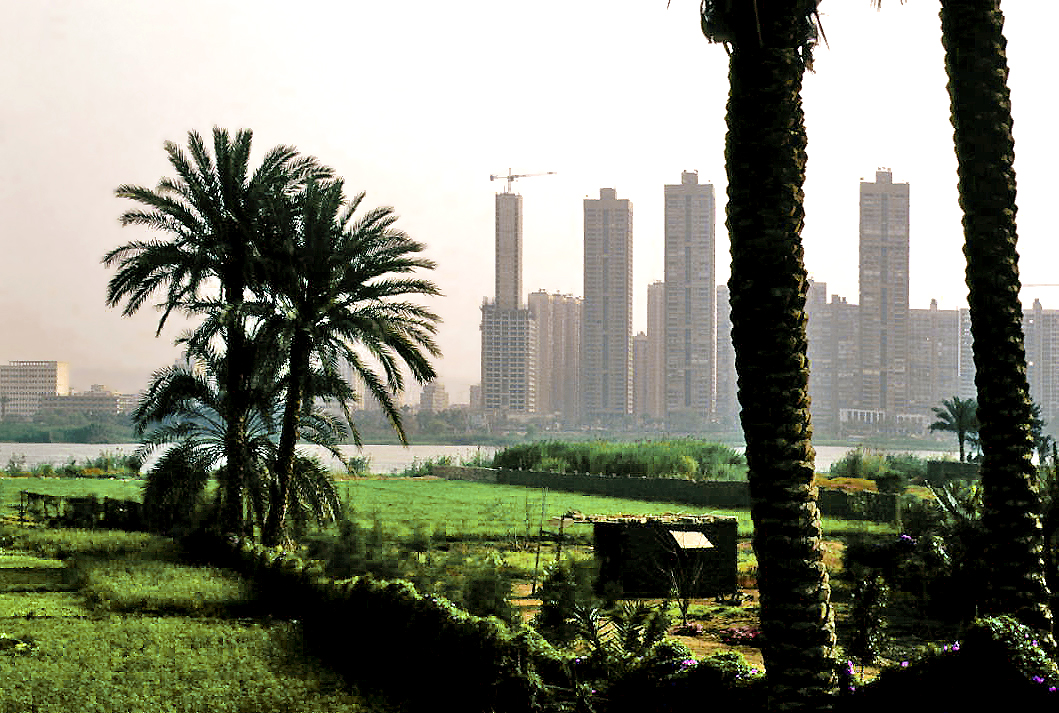
View of Maadi towers from Maadi Island

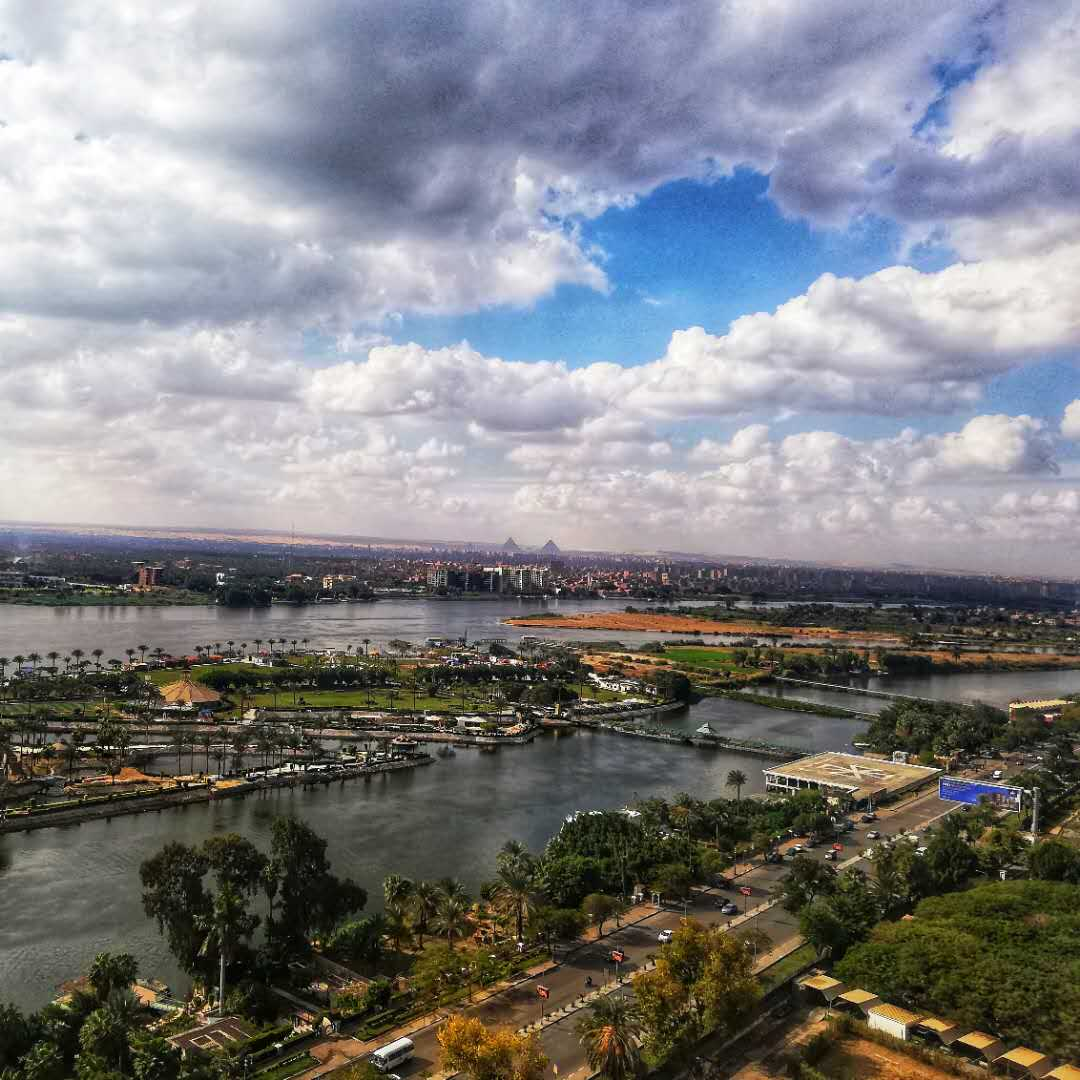
Maadi Island

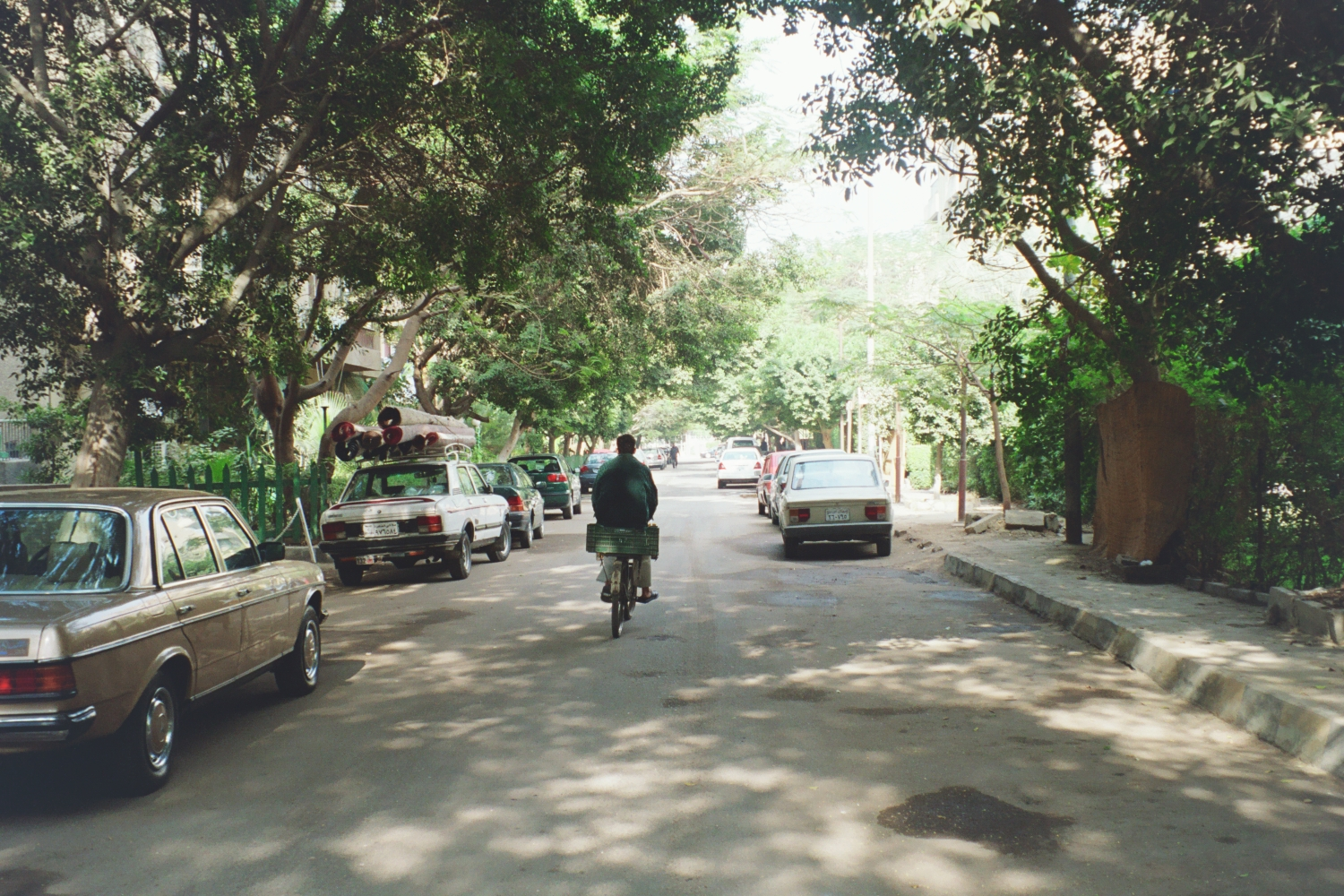
Residential street in Maadi

Along with its affluent residents, Maadi is home to many major restaurants, outlets and chains as well as a variety of high-end clothing shops, and other retail businesses, many of which are located along the locally famous "Road 9", Nasr St, or new Maadi as well as Maadi's original "downtown" located just south of the Maadi Metro stop on the east side of the track. Road 9 still remains a hub for both locals and expats with its diverse dining options as well as coffee shops and even bookstores.

Taisei Corporation has its North Africa office in Maadi.

=== Transportation ===
Maadi is served by the Cairo Metro's Line 1, which has now taken over the Cairo-to-Helwan railway. There are three stops in Maadi – from north to south: Hadayek El Maadi, Maadi and Sakanat (Thakanat) El Maadi. Further metro construction in Maadi is foreseen, especially related to Line 6, but nothing is beyond the proposal stage as yet.

Egyptian National Railways also operates a line through Maadi, although it is strictly a freight line. There is no longer any passenger service; the station is now closed.

=== Nature protected areas in Maadi ===
- Wadi Degla Protected Area
- Protected fossil trees

=== Culture ===
Cultural life in Maadi is geared to a great extent towards serving the large expatriate and affluent, bilingual Egyptian populations. For expatriates, Maadi offers a variety of community activities: religious institutions (many churches and a synagogue), amateur theatre groups, sporting clubs, adult courses, and other interest groups. The Maadi Sporting Club, for example, has served the local expat and Egyptian communities since 1921. It is also associated with the Maadi Sporting & Yacht Club by the Nile. Maadi has also become a popular place for foreigners to study Arabic, as the suburb now hosts a number of local language schools.

Cultural venues include the new Egyptian Geological Museum and the large Maadi Library.

Cultural life, locally, largely revolves around dining out and shopping. In addition to numerous Western restaurant chains and cafés, Maadi offers a variety of international cuisine. The most popular places for westerners to shop at "local" stores is along Road 9. There are also international and multilingual bookshops selling foreign newspapers and magazines catering to Maadi's multi-ethnic population.

== Educational institutions ==
Maadi has a variety of public and private schools. International schools in Maadi include:

- Cairo American College
- Lycée Français du Caire - Maadi Primary Campus
- Victory College
- Maadi Community School
- Al-Amal Semi-International School
- The Higher Institute of Engineering - Thebes Academy
- The Higher Institute of Computers - Thebes Academy
- Sadat Academy For Management Sciences
- Kompass Nursery and Primary Schools
- Maadi British International School (MBIS)
- Maadi Brighton International School

St. Leo's Patriarchal Seminary, founded in 1953, provides training for Coptic Catholic priests.

== Sport ==
During World War II members of the 2nd New Zealand Expeditionary Force based at Maadi Camp competed in regattas on the Nile against local Egyptian rowing clubs. At a regatta held on 20 November 1943 the Maadi Camp Rowing Club "Kiwi" oarsmen beat the Cairo River Club by 11 points to six to win the Freyberg Cup, which they then gifted to the competitors. In return, as a token of friendship, Youssef Bahgat presented the Kiwis with a cup.

Youssef Bahgat's cup was offered to the NZARA (now NZRA) as a trophy for an annual boys' eight-oared race between secondary schools and was brought to New Zealand at the end of the war. Renamed the Maadi Cup it was first raced for in 1947 at Wanganui where it was won by Mount Albert Grammar School. The Maadi Cup gained its native timber pyramid-shaped base from Mt Albert Grammar's woodwork master, Jack Jenkin, in 1951.

The Maadi Sporting Club and Yacht, founded in 1920 by British expatriates who mainly worked at the Delta Real Estate Company, today offers a range of sports, such as Tennis, Football, Swimming, Squash, handball, hockey, Judo, Table Tennis, Sailing, and Rowing.

Victory College is no longer the home of a men's and women's softball league; softball has not been played there since 2015.

== Notable Residents ==
Omar Marmoush, Football player for Manchester City

Ayman Al-Zawahiri, Co-founder of Al Qaeda.

Karim El Mistikawi, Former Squash player.

Karim Darwish, Former Squash player.

Ahmed Barada, Former Squash player, World No. 2 in 1998.

== Embassies ==
There are a number of embassies in Maadi:

- Angola
- Azerbaijan
- Bangladesh
- Burkina Faso
- Côte d'Ivoire
- Cuba
- Dominican Republic
- Ethiopia
- Gabon
- Japan
- Malaysia
- Mauritius
- Mexico
- Mongolia
- Namibia
- North Macedonia
- Peru
- Philippines
- Sierra Leone
- South Africa
- South Sudan
- Tajikistan
- Uganda
- Ukraine
- Venezuela

== See also ==
- Helwan
- Al-Khalifa District
- 15th of May City
- Greater Cairo
