= Maadi-Buto culture =

Prehistoric Eyptian culture

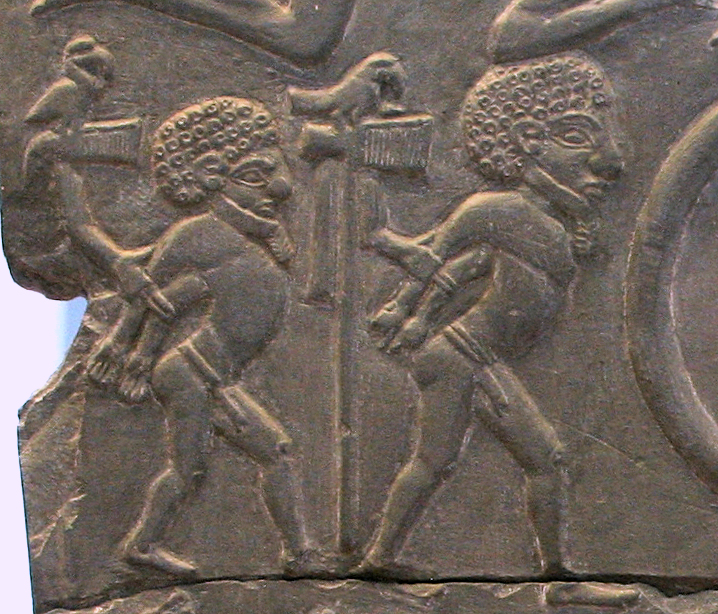
The prisoners on the Battlefield Palette may be the people of the Buto-Maadi culture subjugated by the Egyptian rulers of Naqada III.

The Maadi-Buto culture, also Maadian culture or Lower Egyptian culture, was a culture of Prehistoric Egypt. It consists in about a dozen sites, including the excavated cemetery and settlement complex Maadi near modern Cairo. The Maadian culture is first identified during the second part of Naqada I and continued until Naqada IIc/d, when it was replaced by the Naqada II culture. Major sites include el-Gerza, Haraga, Abusir el-Melek, and Minshat Abu Omar.

== History ==
The Maadian culture emerged from the earliest Neolithic sites of the Nile Valley, in the Faiyum region and at Merimda Beni Salama and el-Omari. It was much less developed than the contemporary cultures of Naqada I and Naqada II.

Settlements had walls made from plant material, formed from wooden posts and wattle-and-daub screens. Cemeteries had few burial goods. Pottery was globular with a broad, flat base, a rather narrow neck, and flared rims. Pottery and flintwork have strong similarities with the contemporary Chalcolithic culture of Palestine.

== Downfall ==
The people of Naqada II and Naqada III seem to have expanded northward into Lower Egypt, replacing the Maadian culture. Maadi was first conquered during Naqada II c-d. The cultures of Lower Egypt were replaced by Upper Egypt and Naqada culture by the end of Naqada II circa 3200 BCE. The Maadian culture of Buto, Tell Ibrahim Awad, Tell el-Rub'a, and Tell el-Farkha were vacated, giving way to the Naqada III culture. This however, has yet to be fully decided by historians.

== Gallery ==
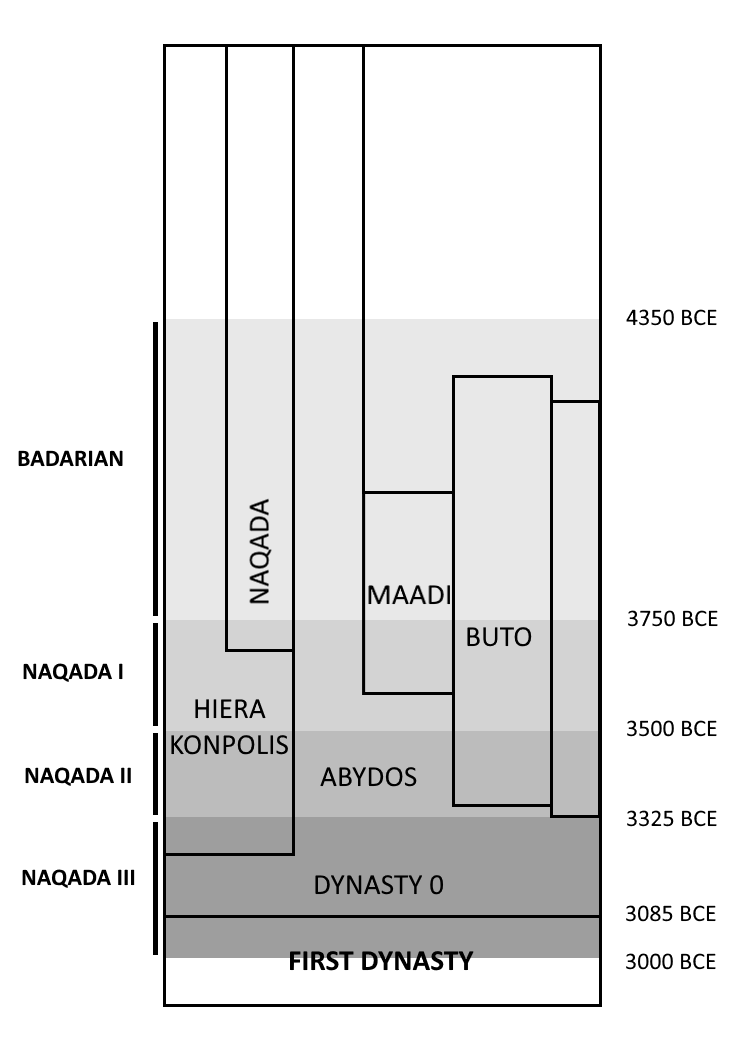
Chronology of state formation in Ancient Egypt.

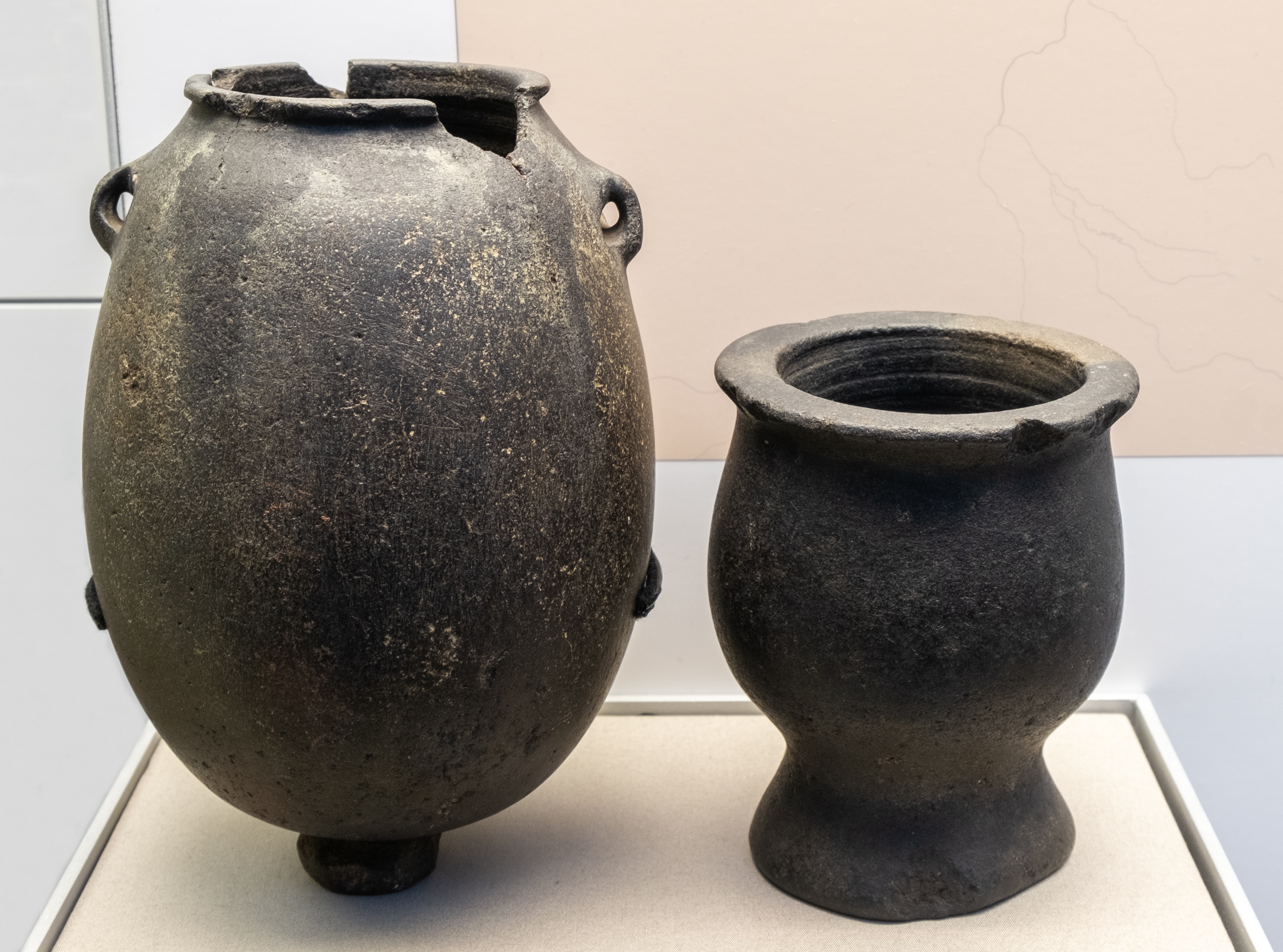
Lower-Egypt basalt jars in the shape of pottery from Maadi, Naqada I–II period, British Museum EA 34398, EA 26654

== Sources ==
- Shaw, Ian, ed. (2003). The Oxford history of ancient Egypt. Oxford; New York: Oxford University Press. p. 59. ISBN 9780192804587.
- Kemp, Barry John (2018). Ancient Egypt: anatomy of a civilization (3rd ed.). New-York (NY): Routledge. ISBN 978-0415827263.
