= Minshat Abu Omar =

Ancient cemetery in Egypt

- Sharkia
- Location within Egypt
- 30°51′26″N 32°01′10″E
- Type: Cemetery, settlement
- Periods: Protodynasties, Early Dynasties, Late Roman Period
- Location: Egypt; Al Sharqia Governorate; Nile Delta
- Region: Upper Egypt

Site notes
- Excavation dates: 1978-1991
- Archaeologists: Dietrich Wildung

Minshat Abu Omar (also written Minschat Abu Omar; Arab. Minshāt Abū 'Umar) is an important archaeological site in Northern Egypt. It lies around 93.21 miles north-east of Cairo in the Nile Delta. Minshat Abu Omar contains several cemeteries from protodynastic dynasties, as well as many burial sites that date back to the late Roman Era.

== Archaeological history ==
The site was first noted during a regional archaeological survey by H. W. Müller in 1966. Excavations were conducted in 10 seasons between 1978 and 1991 by a Munich East-Delta team led by Dietrich Wildung.

== The cemeteries ==
The cemeteries were excavated mostly at the southern corner of the area. 420 tombs are dating back to the late Naqada III period up to the beginning of the 1st dynasty. 2630 tombs date back to the late Roman period. The early tombs, especially, are of great interest to Egyptologists, archaeologists and historians, because they come from different dynasties and show important developments in their architecture.

The protodynastic tombs were oval, 1.0–1.5m long and 1.5–2.0m deep. They contained simple pits, in which the deceased was laid down in a fetal pose, his head facing toward the west. Beside and around the deceased, several bowls and vases were placed; in some of the tombs, precious artifacts made of ivory and stone were found.

The early dynastic tombs changed quickly in architecture, now they had mud plastered inner walls and they were rectangular in shape. Their floors were covered and strengthened with reed mats, their ceilings made of reed and – in case of royal tombs – cedar wood. Royal tombs were now divided into two, four or six chambers and contained much more precious grave goods. Famous objects such as several cosmetic palettes, ivory bracelets with relief decoration and collars made of carnelian- and amethyst beads were found. Famous kings, whose name were found, are Scorpion II, Narmer and Aha.

The Roman period tombs are simple in their structure and design; they were oval or rectangular and contained coffins made of wood, ceramics and limestone. Children were buried in large amphorae. Some of the tombs contained coins and amulets.

== Evaluations ==
The excavated cemeteries and nearby settlements, their grave goods and the geographical position of that area (at the easternmost border of early dynastic Egypt), lead archaeologists and Eyptologists to the conclusion that Minshat Abu Omar was an important economic and strategic place. Findings, which were of early Palestine origin, but found in several larger tombs at Minshat Abu Omar, prove that during the Naqada III period numerous items were already traded between Egypt and the levantine states; the trade economy flourished greatly. Artifacts and weapons with the names of Narmer, Aha and Djet were found in Israel, Jordan and even in Lebanon, which proves successful trading during the first dynasties.

== See also ==
- Dynasties of ancient Egypt
- Egyptian chronology
- Tell el-Farkha
- Tell el-Murra
