= Tell el-Farkha =

Archaeological site in Egypt

- Location within Egypt
- 30°52′14″N 31°36′9″E
- Type: settlement
- Periods: Late Chalcolithic, Early Bronze Age
- Location: Egypt

History
- Built: Early 4th millennium BC

Site notes
- Excavation dates: 1988-1990, 1998-present
- Archaeologists: Rodolfo Fattovich, Sandro Salvatori, Marek Chłodnicki, Krzysztof Ciałowicz
- Condition: Ruined
- Owner: Public
- Public access: Yes

Tell el-Farkha ("Chicken Hill") is an ancient archaeological site in the eastern Nile Delta lying about 120 kilometers northeast of Cairo. It was occupied from about 3700 BC until about 2600 BC encompassing the Lower Egyptian and Early Naqada cultures and the Protodynastic period.

A notable find at Tell el-Farkha were three serekh inscriptions of the Predynastic ruler Iry-Hor. Two other unknown serekhs were also found. All were found in graves.

== Archaeology ==
The site of Tell el-Farkha consists of three tells (Western Kom, Central Kom, Eastern Kom) with a total area of about 400 meters by 110 meters (just over 4 hectares) and a height of about 5 meters above the plain. It was first noted in 1987 by Italian Archaeological Mission to the Eastern Nile Delta of the Centro Studi e Ricerche Ligabue in Venice.

It was first excavated between 1988 and 1990 by a team from the Centro Studi e Ricerche Ligabue led by Rodolfo Fattovich and Sandro Salvatori, limited to the Old Kingdom remains. After a hiatus excavation resumed in 1998 by a team under the auspices of the Institute of Archaeology of the Jagiellonian University in Kraków and the Polish Center of Archaeology of Warsaw University under the direction of Marek Chłodnicki and Krzysztof Ciałowicz and continue to the present. Six copper harpoons, in the form of grave goods, were dated by associated pottery to the Naqada III period. Similar harpoons were found at nearby Tell el-Murra.

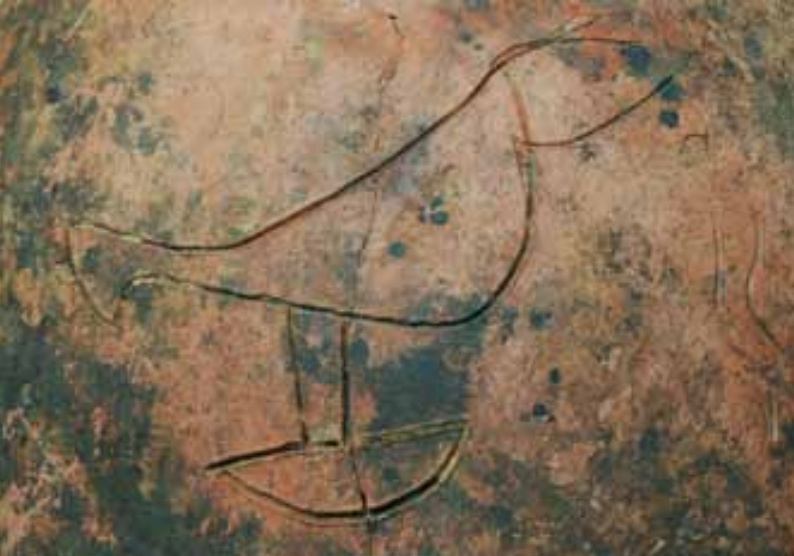
Name of King Iry-Hor, Dynasty 0, Eastern Kom, Tell el-Farkha.

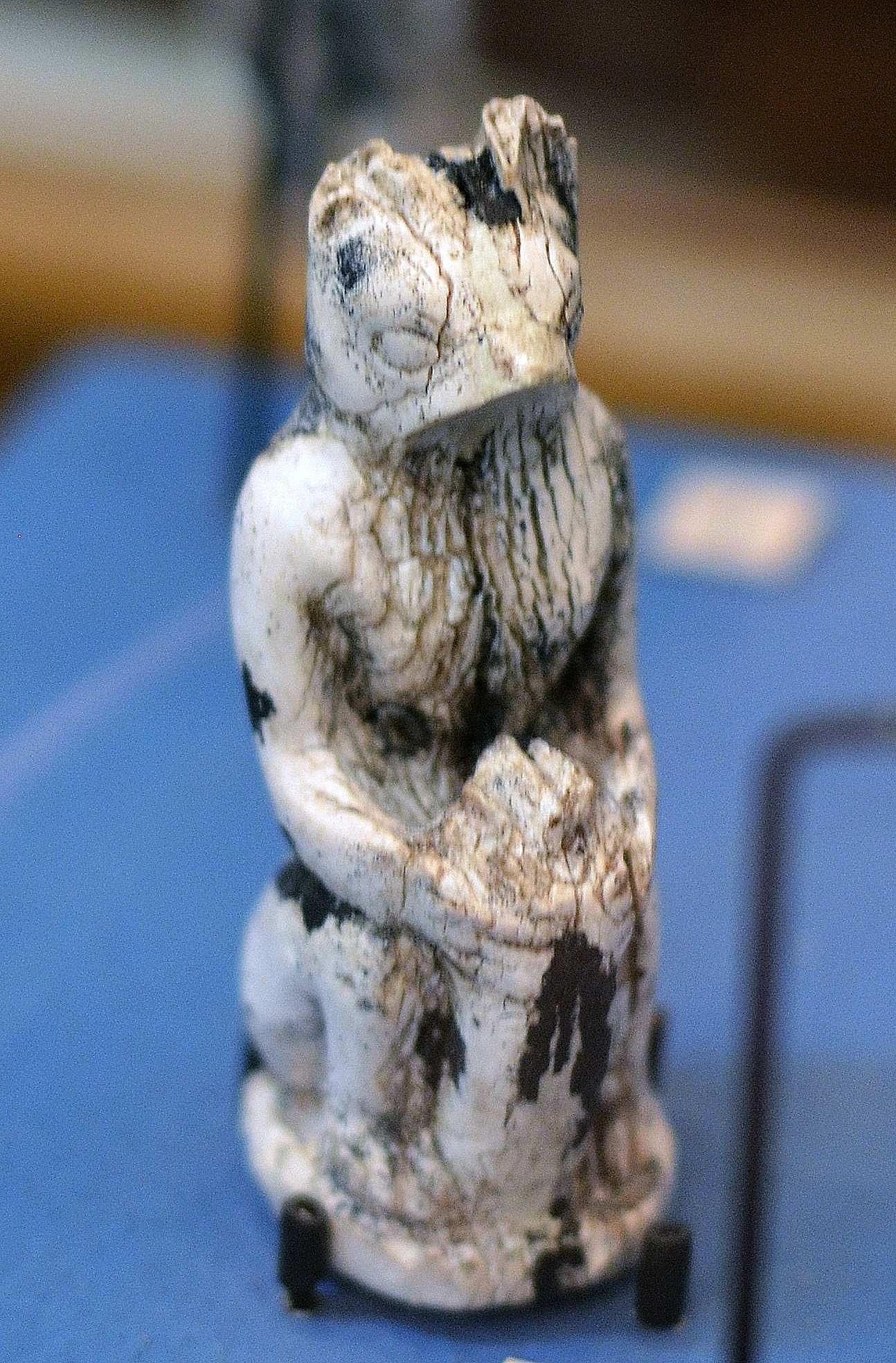
Falcon-headed feline predator or "griffin". Late Predynastic period, end of Dynasty 0, Western Kom, Tell el-Farkha.

During this period an administrative-cultic center developed on Western Kom and a necropolis developed on Eastern Kom. Four of the burials were of higher status and included a number of beer jars. The Central Kom bore a residential-business zone. In Phase 3 (Naqada IIIA1) a large warehouse was constructed and there was widespread trade with the Southern Levant. The warehouse went out of use at the end of Phase 4 and in Phase 5 the warehouse was replaced by residences and all signs of Levantine trade vanished. This activity peaked during Dynasty 0 and gradually faded during the First Dynasty. The administrative-cultic center contained two chapels where many votive objects were found. In one chapel these included figurines of baboons and one figurine of a naked prostrating man. The second chapel included libation jugs and stands and figurines of people and animals, many made of hippopotamus ivory. Other finds on the Western Kom included "miniature boats of various types, granaries, boxes, mirrors, cylindrical seals, game pieces, and stone vessels".

At the necropolis on Eastern Kom 150 graves were excavated so far with dates ranging from Dynasty 0 to early Fourth Dynasty. The necropolis featured a 16.9 meter by 18.1 meter mmonument, over 300 square meters with 1.50 meter to 2 meter thick walls, building built in Pase 4 (Naqada IIIA2/B1). The building, in the north-western part, had a 6.6 meter by 8.1 meter square main chamber with a descending shaft and is interpreted by the excavators as an early form of mastaba tomb better known from the later First Dynasty as are several smaller tombs at the site.

Numerous vessels were found at the site with "pot marks", probably used for the marking and inventory of goods, which are sometimes considered as the ancestors of hieroglyphs. Names of the rulers of Dynasty 0 also appear on these vessels, such as Iry-Hor, who is otherwise known from the Abydos area. The name of Narmer, the first historical king, also appears on two vessels.

=== Brewery ===
Notable finds include the earliest (c. 3500 BC) known brewery, on the Western Kom, consisting of a thirteen large circular brick vats in two parallel rows in a space encompassing 6 meters by 3.4 meters. Built on top of earlier Lower Egyptian Culture remains the brewey had three phases. It was first constructed in Naqada IID period then rebuilt in Naqada IIIA1 before being destroyed in the catastrophic fire that destroyed most of the settlement. The brewery was then rebuilt in Tell el-Farkha Phase 4 (Naqada IIIA1/2–IIIB.

Microscopic and chemical study of charred crusts adhering to the interiors of the mud-brick brewing vats and associated plant remains indicate that the mash consisted mainly of emmer wheat with a smaller component of barley, prepared in two separately treated grain portions—an uncooked malt and a well-cooked cereal gruel—that were mixed to produce a sugar-rich wort for fermentation. Recent microstructural work on the carbonized cereal products from these vats has identified diagnostic thinning of emmer aleurone cell walls, confirming that deliberate malting formed part of the brewing sequence.

=== Golden figurines ===
On the Eastern Kom, in addition to the necropolis, there was a small village where a deposit of "gold foil, carnelian and ostrich eggshell beads of a necklace, and two large flint knives " was found. When reconstructed the gold fragments formed two statuettes of nude men with lapis lazuli eyes. The taller is around 60 cm tall, and the shorter about 30 cm. Both figures are depicted as bald and beardless with protruding ears, finely detailed finger- and toenails, and exaggerated phalluses. Each is also equipped with a large phallus sheath. The larger figure also has a beaded necklace. The core of the statuettes, now decomposed, was likely made of wood, which was covered with thin sheets of gold fastened with 140 golden rivets. The lapis lazuli came from what is now modern day Afghanistan.

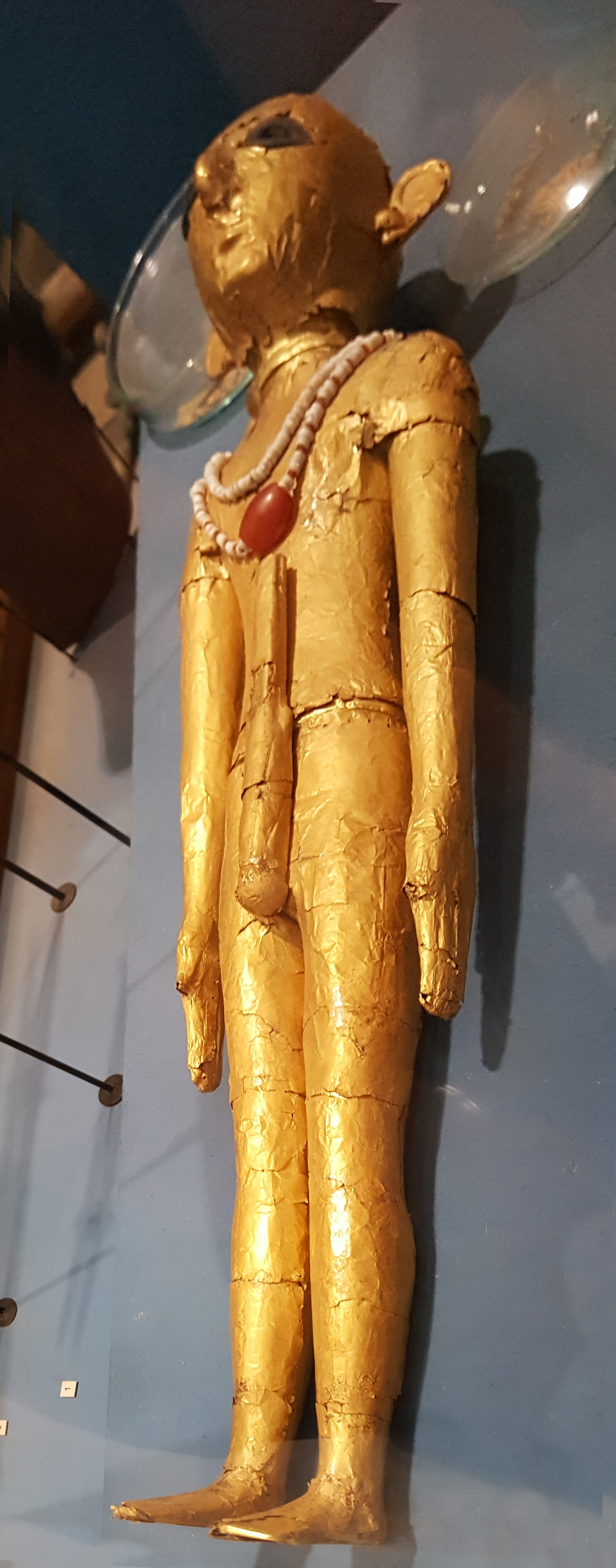
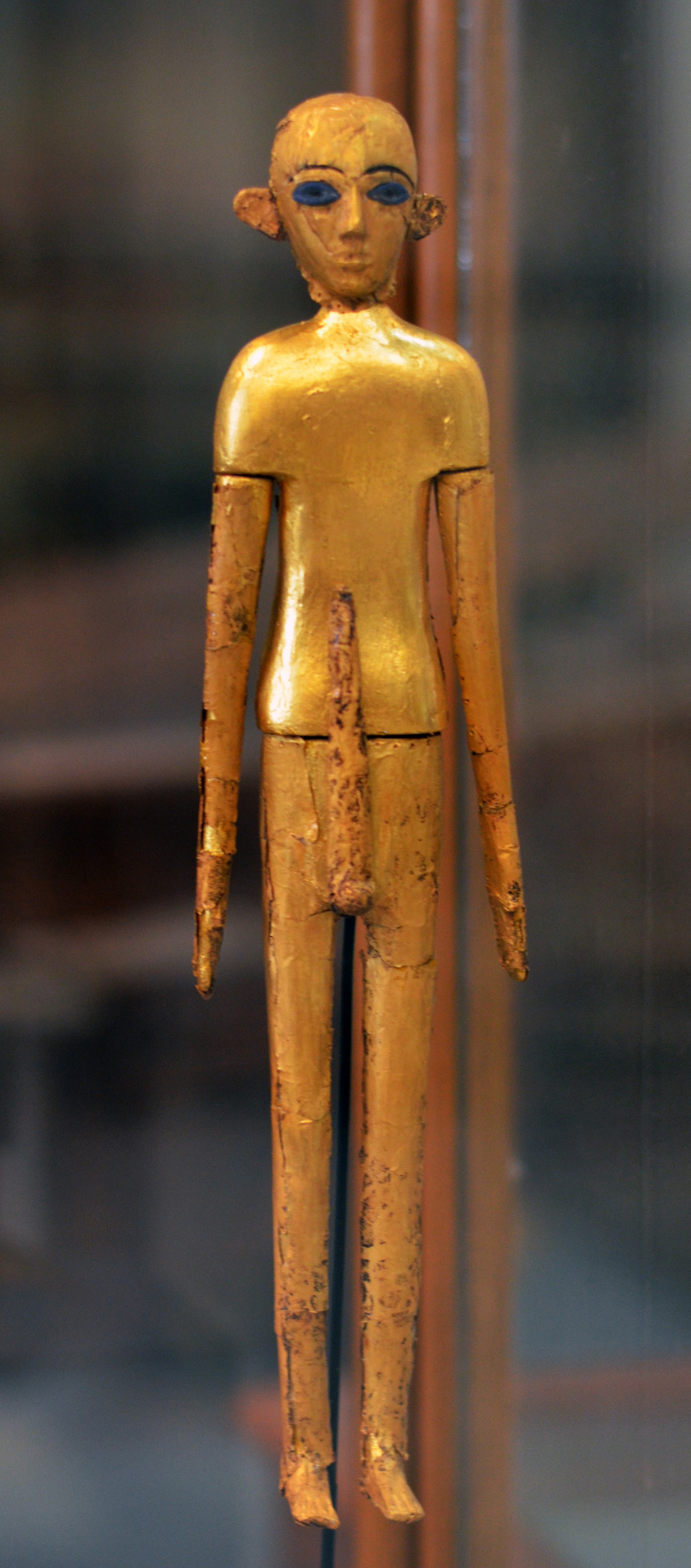
(60 cm father left, 30cm son right). Late Predynastic period (Naqada IIIB, c. 3200–3000 BC). Egyptian Museum (Cairo).

These characteristics follow the stylistic conventions of Predynastic Egyptian art, similar to the Mahasna statuette (Amratian Period), or the Ashmolean Museum Mac Gregor Man statuette. The golden statuettes most probably depict a Predynastic ruler and his son during the heb-sed festival, and they probably adorned a shrine in the Western Kom area. They are thought to belong to the Naqada IIIB period (c. 3200–3000 BC), or possibly even Naqada IIIA (circa 3300 BC). Together with the figures, two large flint knives were discovered, as well as a necklace of 382 beads (326 ostrich egg shells and 56 carnelian beads), dated to the same period.

== History ==
Occupation at the site began in the Lower Egyptian culture which ran from about 3700 BC until 3300 BC. The next phase was part of the Naqada culture which is thought to have originated in the south of Egypt. The site reached its peak in the Protodynastic period, Dynasties 0 and 1, about 3000 BC. After that occupation at the site went into decline and ended entirely in the early Fourth Dynasty, about 2600 BC. Throughout the occupation there was widespread trade with the ancient Near East and Upper Egypt, the site being on a major trade route. Excavators of the site determined a periodization:

- Phase - 1 Naqada IIB – IIC (c. 3700–3500 BC)
- Phase - 2 Naqada IID1 (c. 3500–3450 BC)
- Phase - 3 Naqada IID2/IIIA1 (c. 3450–3350 BC)
- Site largely destroyed by catastrophic fire
- Phase - 4 Naqada IIIA1 – IIIB (c. 3350–3200 BC)
- Significant cultural and economic changes
- Phase - 5 Naqada IIIB – IIIC1 (c. 3200–3000 BC) (Iry-Hor–Djer)
- Phase - 6 Naqada IIIC2–IIID (c. 3000–2700 BC) (Djet–Khasekhemwy)
- Phase - 7 Dynasty III/IV (c. 2700–2600 BC)

== See also ==
- Cities of the ancient Near East
- Dynasties of ancient Egypt
- Egyptian chronology
