= Gebel Kamil (meteorite) =

Meteorite found in Egypt

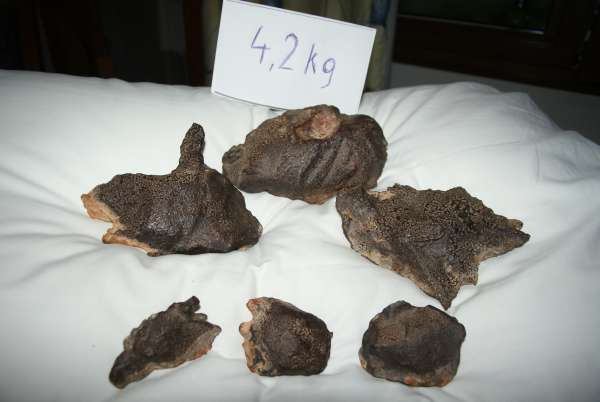
- Shrapnel from the meteoritic impactor
- Type: Ataxite
- Structural classification: Ataxite
- Group: Ungrouped
- Country: Egypt
- Region: Al Wadi al Jadid, East Uweinat Desert
- Coordinates: 22°01′06″N 26°05′16″E
- Observed fall: No
- Fall date: < 5000 years ago
- Found date: 2009-02-19
- TKW: 1,600 kilograms (3,500 lb)
- Strewn field: Yes
- Alternative names: Radon meteorite
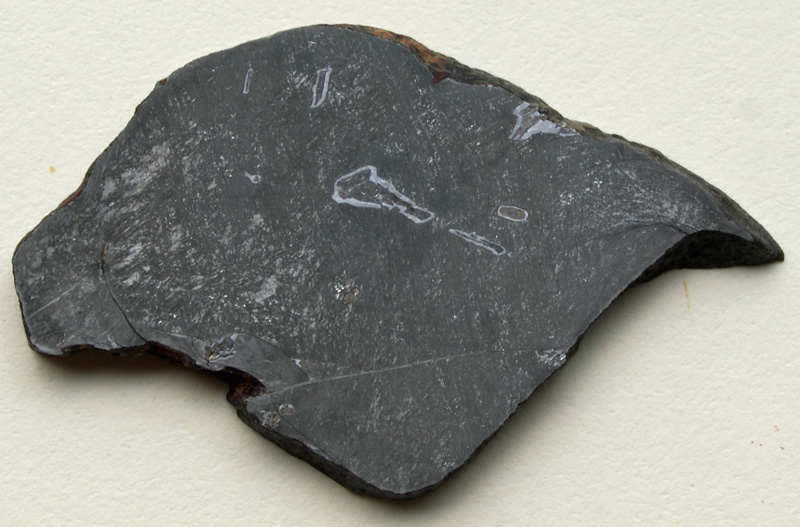
- A slice of the Gebel Kamil meteorite showing schreibersite rimmed by kamacite.
- Related media on Wikimedia Commons

Gebel Kamil is a meteorite that struck Egypt later than 3000 BC, leaving a crater surrounded by thousands of pieces of iron shrapnel with a total weight of about 1,600 kilograms (3,500 lb).

== History ==
In February 2009 and 2010, meteorite fragments with masses ranging from < 1 gram (0.035 oz) to 35 kilograms (77 lb), plus an 83 kilograms (183 lb) specimen, were found in and around a 45 metres (148 ft) radius from Kamil Crater by an Italian-Egyptian geophysical team. About 800 kilograms (1,800 lb) was recovered. The geophysical survey took place as part of the "2009 Italian-Egyptian Year of Science and Technology".

== Mineralogy ==
Shrapnel fragments of the Gebel Kamil iron meteorite, Egypt

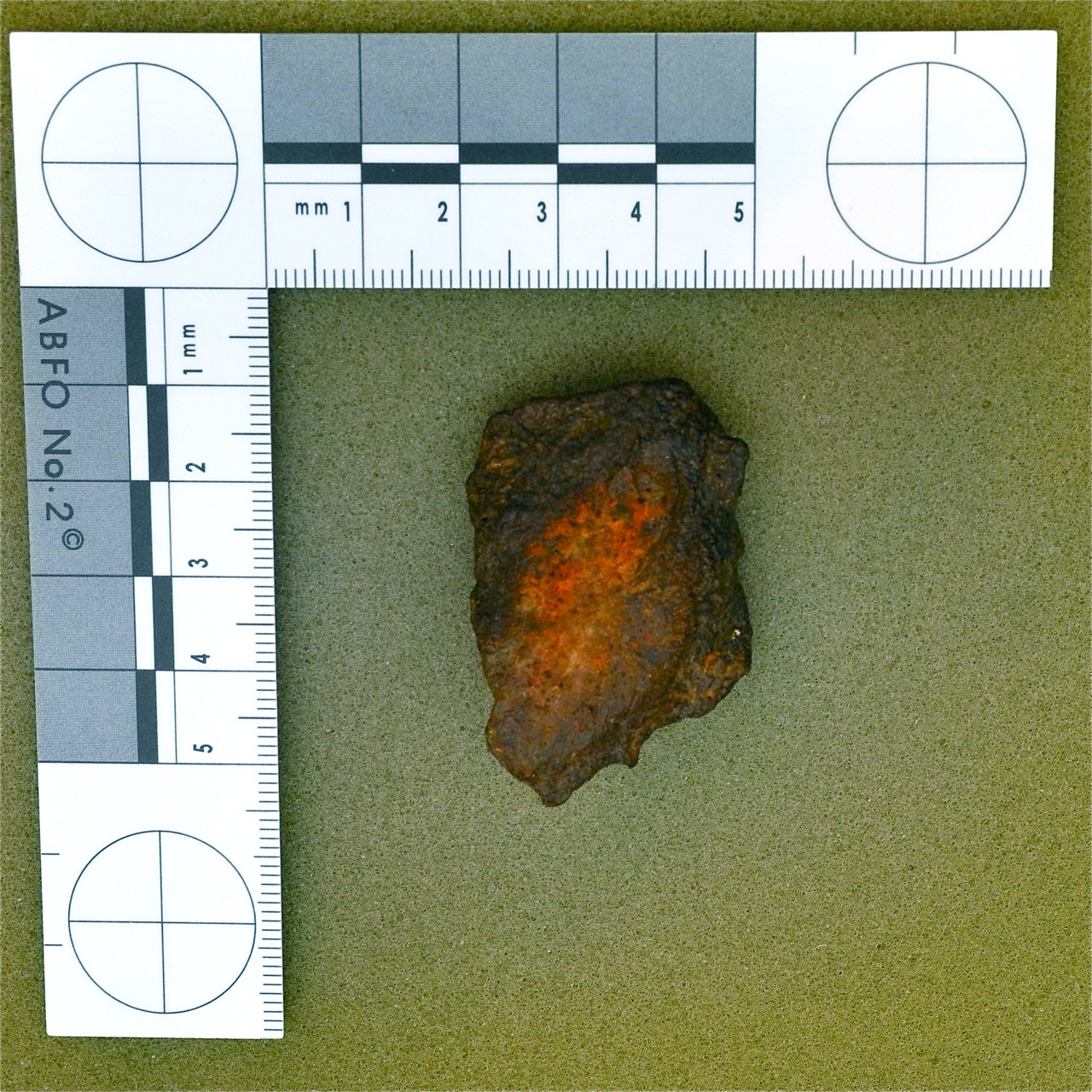
A 60 grams (2.1 oz) fragment from the Gebel Kamil meteorite.

The Gebel Kamil meteorite contains the minerals schreibersite and kamacite.

== Classification ==
The Gebel Kamil meteorite has been classified as an ataxite.

== See also ==
- 2008 TC3
- Glossary of meteoritics
